= Post Oak Ridge State Park =

State park in Texas, United States

- Interactive map of Post Oak Ridge State Park
- Location: Burnet County, Texas, Lampasas County, Texas
- Nearest city: Lampasas
- Coordinates: 31°1′21.98″N 98°25′38.75″W
- Area: 3,118 acres (1,262 ha)
- Established: 2025
- Governing body: Texas Parks and Wildlife Department
- Website: website

Post Oak Ridge State Park is a 3,118-acre (1,262 ha) state park located in Burnet and Lampasas Counties, Texas, United States in the Texas Hill Country just across the Colorado River from Colorado Bend State Park.

The State of Texas acquired the land in 2025. The park opened for day use on September 24, 2026. Recreational activities are limited to hiking, picnicking, and wildlife viewing while other facilities and amenities continue to be developed. Full overnight access to Post Oak Ridge is scheduled for 2029. The park is managed by the Texas Parks and Wildlife Department.

== Nature ==
The park has a savanna landscape of oak trees and prairie, a spring-fed waterway called Yancey Creek and post oak woodlands.

=== Animals ===
An early ecological inventory of reptiles, amphibians and fish logged Rio Grande leopard frog, cottonmouth (or water moccasin), common collared lizard, little brown skink, plain-bellied water snake, plains longear sunfish, western mosquitofish, blacktail shiner, and Texas tetra.

== See also ==
- List of Texas state parks
