= Fort Boggy State Park =

State park in Texas, United States

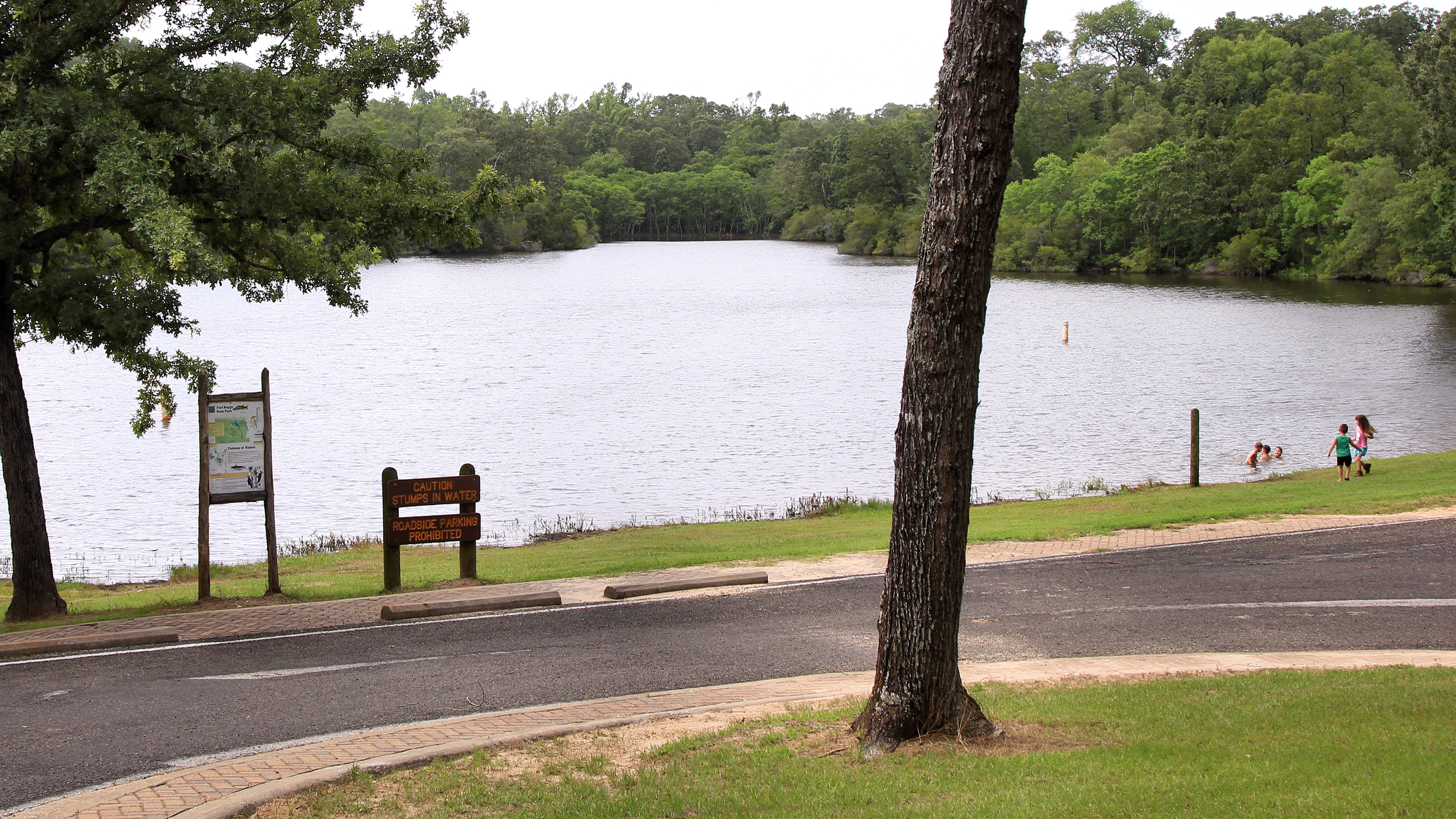
- Swimming area in Fort Boggy State Park

- Location within Texas Location within the United States
- Location: Leon County, Texas, United States
- Nearest city: Leona
- Coordinates: 31°11′20″N 95°59′00″W
- Area: 1,847 acres (747 ha)
- Established: 1985
- Visitors: 21,198 (in 2025)
- Governing body: Texas Parks and Wildlife Department
- Website: Official site

Fort Boggy State Park is a 1,847 acres (747 ha) state park located in Leon County, Texas, United States, between Leona and Centerville that opened in 2001. The park was donated to the Texas Parks and Wildlife Department in 1985 by Eileen Crain Sullivan to be developed as a state park. The park is located near the original Fort Boggy site, a palisade fort built in 1840 by settlers to protect against local Indian predations. It was named Fort Boggy due to its close proximity to Boggy Creek.

== Activities ==
The park features 15-acre Sullivan Lake which is popular for swimming, canoeing, kayaking and fishing. Other activities available include camping, hiking, mountain biking and geocaching.

The park participates in the "Tackle Loaner Program"; individuals can borrow rods, reels and tackle boxes with hooks, sinkers and bobbers. Common types of fish caught include largemouth bass, channel catfish, bluegill, redear sunfish, redbreast sunfish and rainbow trout (seasonal).

== Nature ==
=== Plants ===
The park has woodlands rolling hills, meadows, and wetlands. Large trees species include post oak, black hickory, black tupelo, cedar elm, American sweetgum and pecan. Smaller trees and shrubs include American beautyberry, flowering dogwood, sassafras, yaupon holly, saw greenbriar and Alabama supplejack. Savannah grasslands in the park are made up of little bluestem, Indiangrass, purpletop, switchgrass and the endangered Centerville brazos-mint.

=== Animals ===
Wildlife present in the park include white-tailed deer, raccoon, eastern gray squirrel, fox and American beaver. Waterfowl and wading birds such as mallard and great blue heron and other varieties of aquatic wildlife reside in the park. Painted bunting and pileated woodpecker also call the park home.

== See also ==
- List of Texas state parks
