= Ray Roberts Lake State Park =

State park in Texas, United States

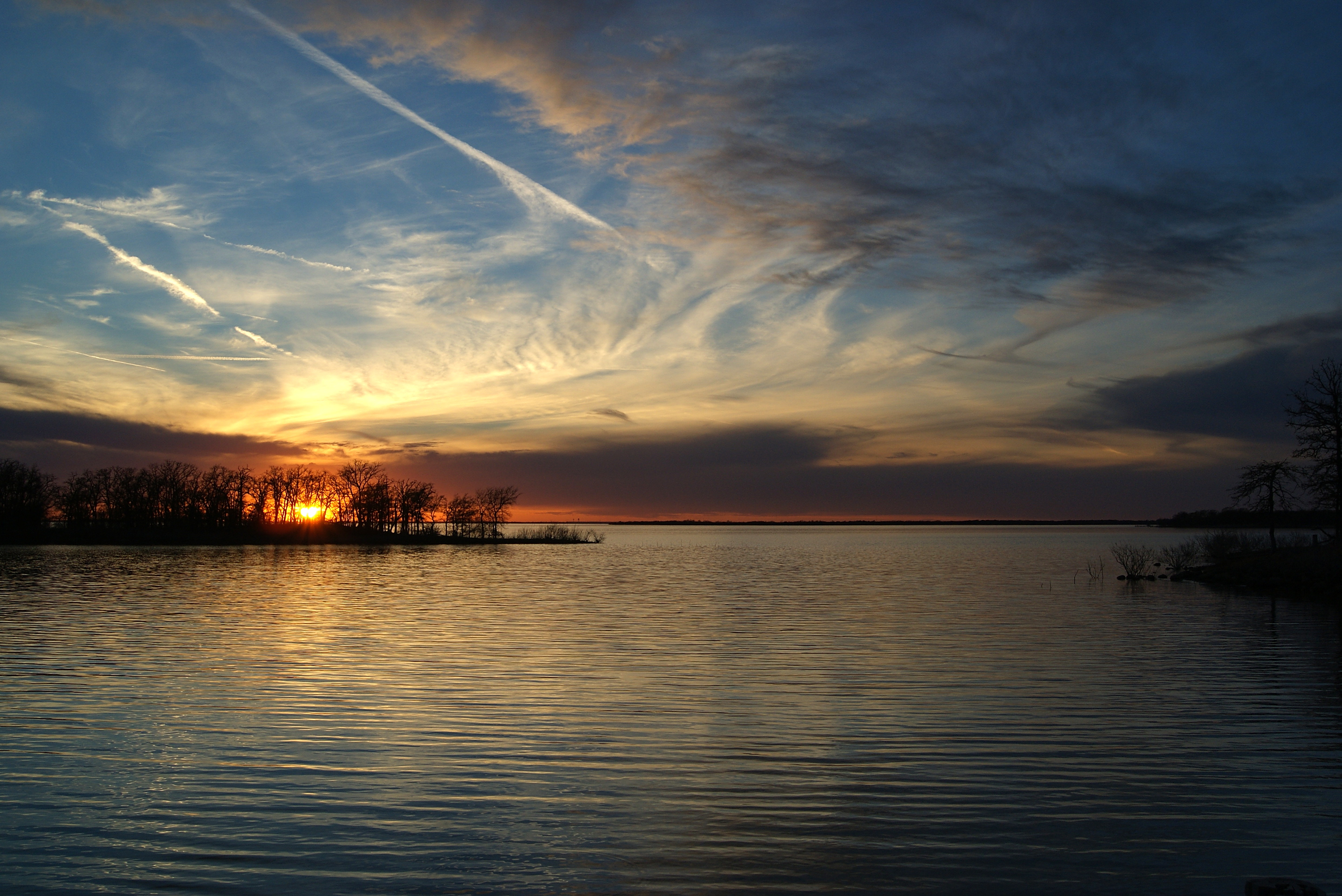
- Ray Roberts Lake State Park, March 2019

- Location within Texas Location within the United States
- Location: Denton County, Texas
- Nearest city: Pilot Point, Texas
- Coordinates: 33°21′56″N 97°0′43″W
- Area: 3,777 acres (1,528 ha)
- Established: 1993
- Named for: Ray Roberts
- Visitors: 863,184 (in 2025)
- Governing body: Texas Parks and Wildlife Department
- Website: Official site

Ray Roberts Lake State Park is a 3,777 acres (1,528 ha) state park located in Denton County, Texas, United States near Pilot Point, Texas. The park is divided into nine units: three are developed (Johnson Branch, Isle du Bois, and the Greenbelt), and six have boat ramps with lake access (Buck Creek, Jordan, Sanger, Pond Creek, Elm Fork, and Pecan Creek). It is named for Herbert Ray Roberts an American Democratic politician who represented Texas's 4th congressional district from 1962 to 1981. The park is very popular due to its proximity to the Dallas–Fort Worth metroplex and was the most visited Texas state park in 2025.

== History ==
Humans have inhabited the Isle du Bois region for over 11,000 years. Native American tribes such as the Kiowa and the Comanche lived in the area around the 1500s. Settlers arrived in the mid-19th century, driving out most Native Americans. The ruins of a 19th century homestead can be found in the Isle du Bois unit of the park.

== Activities ==
The park offers nature programs throughout the year. The park has facilities for camping, picnicking, nature study, hiking, cycling, fishing, swimming, boating, water skiing, wildlife observation, horseback riding, geocaching, and inline skating. Facilities at the park are picnic sites, playground areas, campsites, an amphitheater, a lighted fishing pier, and over 6 miles (9.7 km) of hiking trails, as well as 39.4 miles (63.4 km) of DORBA (Dallas Off-Road Bike Association) hike-and-bike trails and a 20 miles (32 km) greenbelt trail (12 miles (19 km) of which are open to equestrians).

Also located within the park is the Lake Ray Roberts Marina, a privately operated full-service marina.

== Nature ==
The park is at the intersection of three ecoregions: Cross Timbers, Texas Blackland Prairies, and Central Great Plains. Each region is unique with its own flora, fauna and soil.

=== Animals ===
Mammals in the park are white-tailed deer, common raccoon, Virginia opossum, eastern cottontail, eastern fox squirrel, American beaver, Mexican long-nosed armadillo, striped skunk, coyote and bobcat.

Greater roadrunner, great blue heron, wild turkey, painted bunting, scissor-tailed flycatcher, Mississippi kite, American white pelican, great horned owl, eastern screech owl, downy woodpecker, red-bellied woodpecker, yellow-bellied sapsucker mallard and gadwall are likely to be seen. Great horned owl and eastern screech owl are seen to a lesser extent

=== Plants ===
The park has forests containing post oak, blackjack oak, cedar elm, winged elm, honey mesquite, eastern cottonwood, black willow and pecan. Wildflowers seen are black-eyed Susan, spotted horsemint and meadow pink. Little bluestem is a predominate grass in the park.

== See also ==
- List of Texas state parks
