= Lake Whitney State Park =

State park in Texas, United States

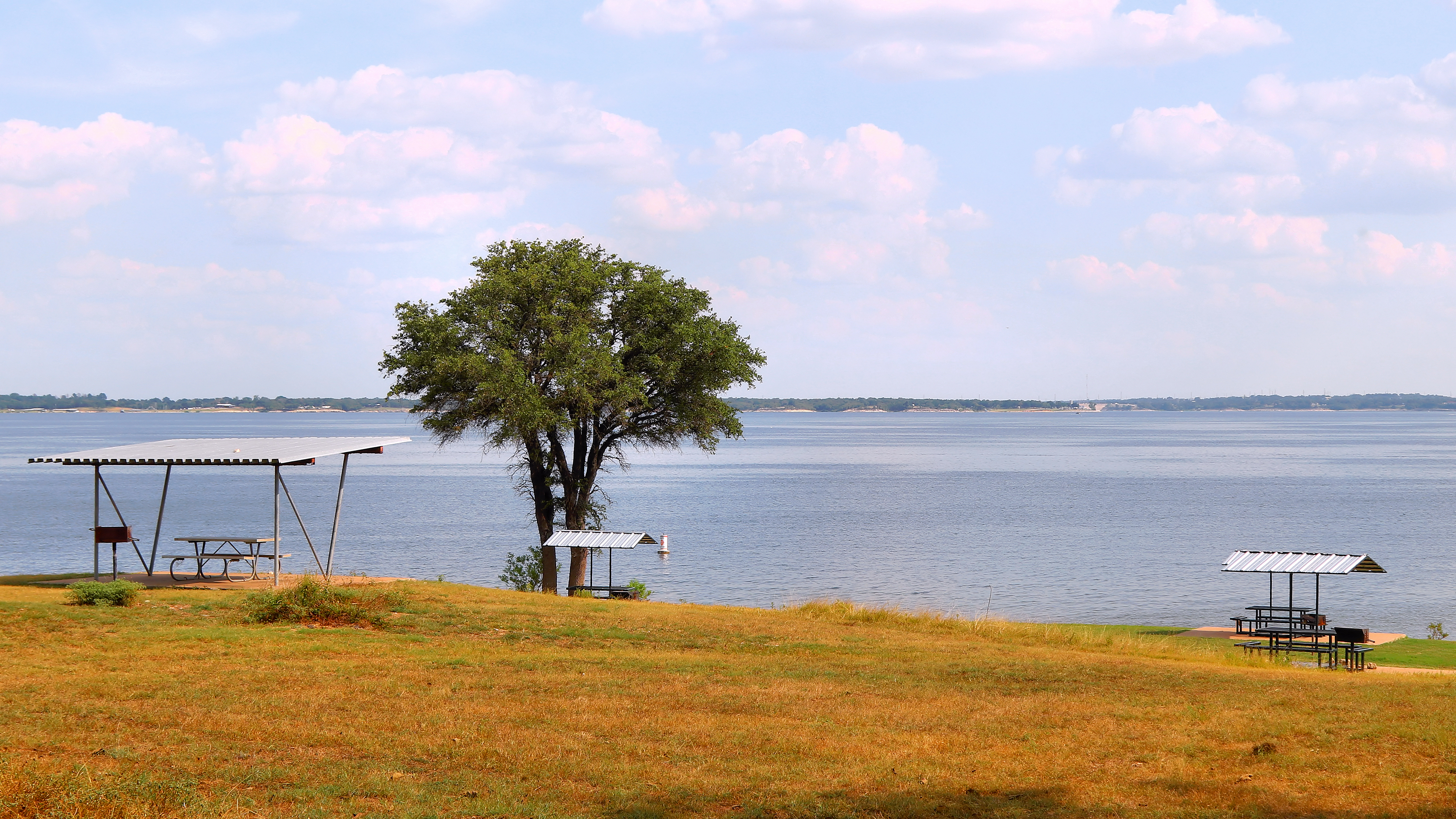
- Day use area at Lake Whitney State Park

- Location within Texas Location within the United States
- Location: Hill County, Texas
- Nearest city: Whitney, Texas
- Coordinates: 31°55′52″N 97°21′24″W
- Area: 775 acres (314 ha)
- Established: 1954
- Visitors: 105,178 (in 2025)
- Governing body: Texas Parks and Wildlife Department
- Website: Official site

Lake Whitney State Park is a state park located in Hill County, Texas, United States near Whitney, Texas. The 775 acres (314 ha) park opened in 1965 and is managed by the Texas Parks and Wildlife Department.

== History ==
Lake Whitney was created in 1951 when the United States Army Corps of Engineers constructed a dam on the Brazos River in order to prevent flooding in downstream communities such as Waco.

The Texas Parks and Wildlife Department leased 775-acres along the east shore of Lake Whitney for Lake Whitney State Park from the United States Department of the Army in 1954.

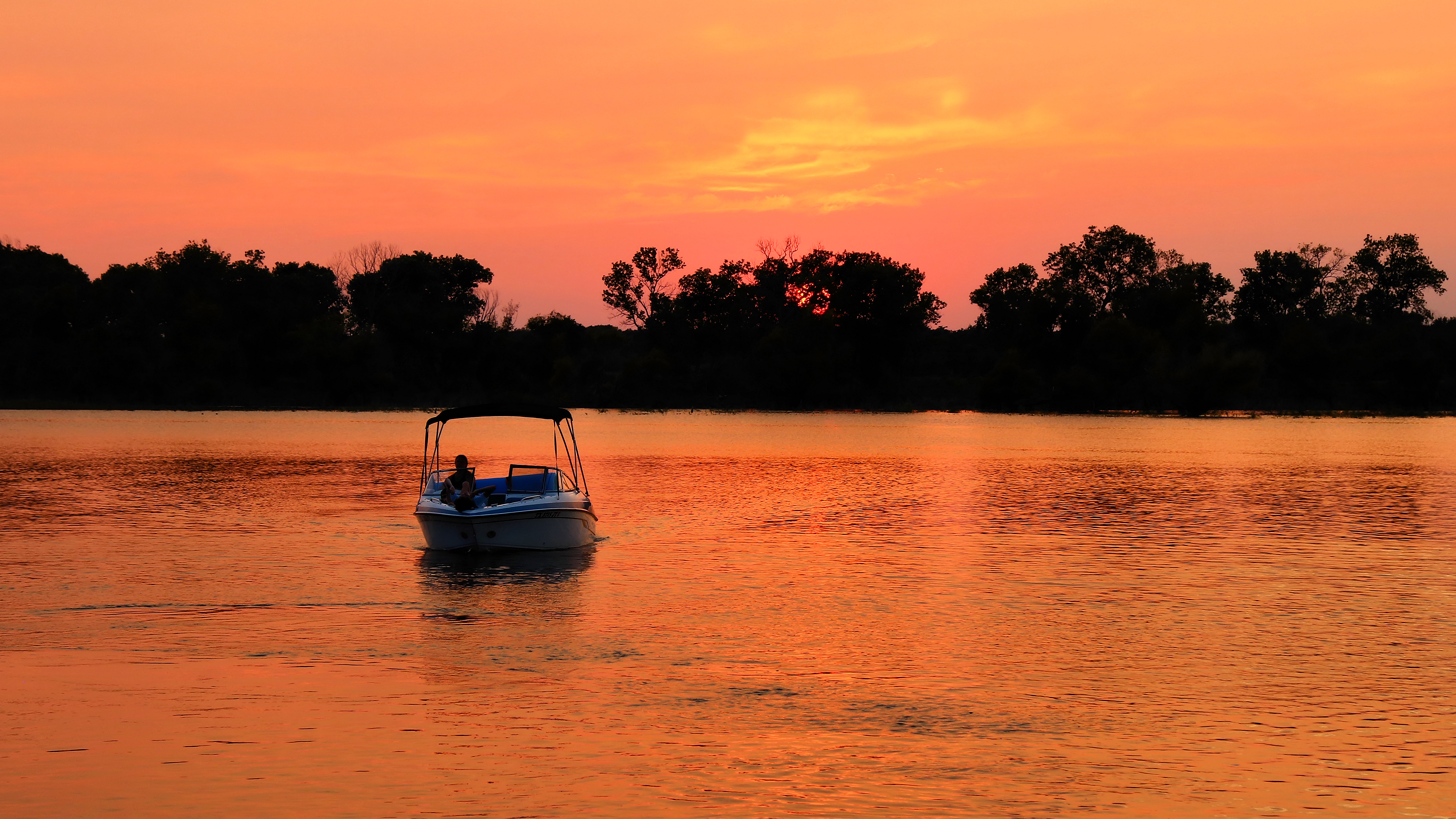
A boater pulling into the boat ramp.

== Recreation ==
The park has facilities for fishing, swimming, boating, water skiing, nature study, bird watching, and geocaching. There are 2.1 miles (3.4 km) of trails in the park that can be used for hiking and cycling. The park rangers lead nature programs throughout the year.

Overnight camping facilities include tent and recreational vehicle sites and screened shelters. The recreational vehicle sites have water, electricity and sewage hookups available.

== Nature ==
The "Big Oak", the largest Texas live oak in the park.

=== Animals ===
Mammal species includes white-tailed deer, common raccoon, eastern fox squirrel, eastern cottontail, Mexican long-nosed armadillo, gray fox, coyote, and bobcat.

The park hosts nearly 200 species of birds such as bald eagle, American white pelican, greater roadrunner, great blue heron and little blue heron.

=== Plants ===
The park lies on the Washita Prairie, and features both grasslands and woodlands. Some trees species are cedar elm, post oak, Texas live oak and sugar hackberry.

== See also ==
- List of Texas state parks
