= Purtis Creek State Park =

State park in Texas, United States

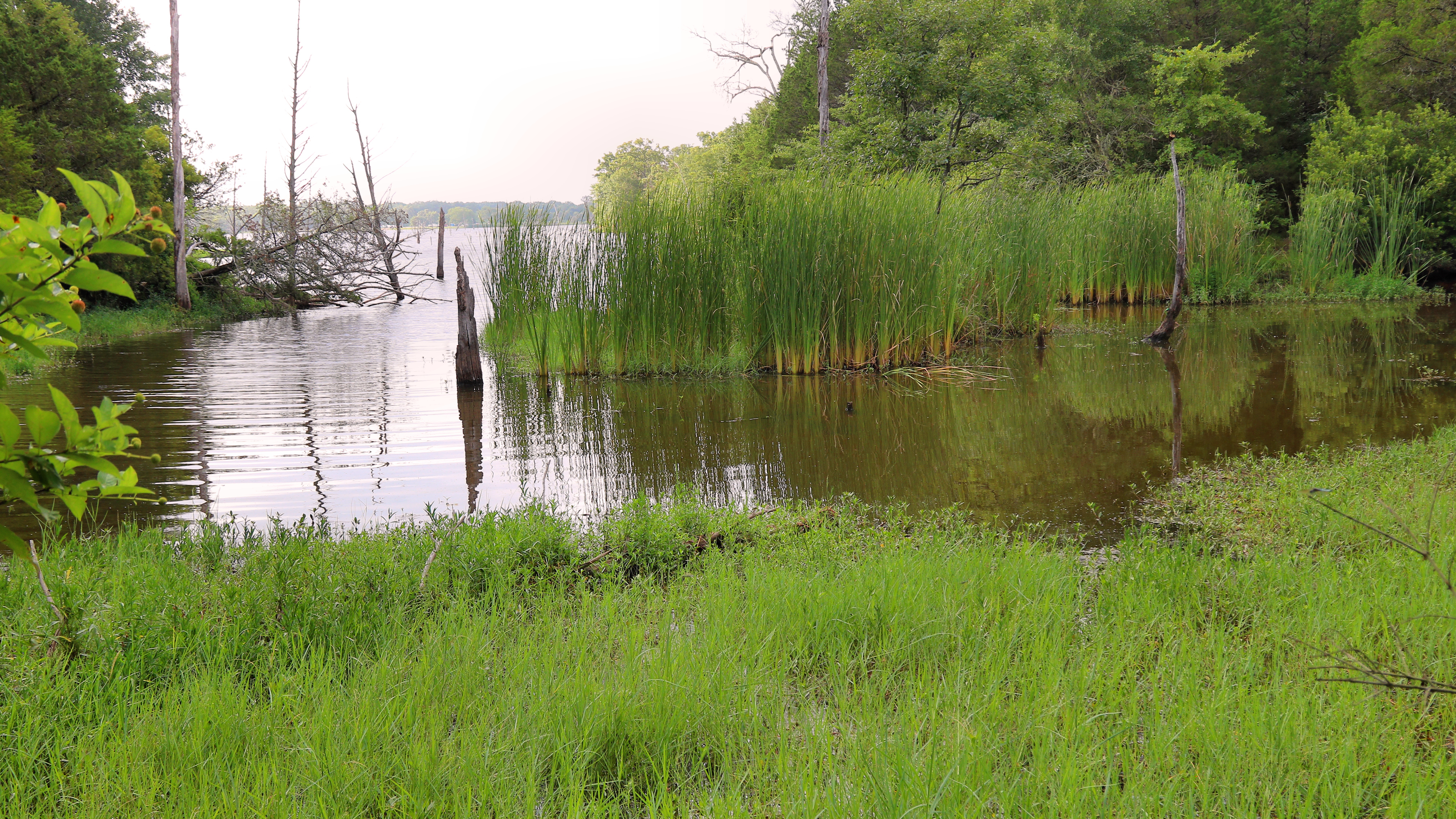

- Location within Texas Location within the United States
- Location: Henderson and Van Zandt counties, Texas
- Nearest city: Eustace, Texas
- Coordinates: 32°21′44″N 96°0′6″W
- Area: 1,582.4 acres (6.404 km^{2})
- Established: 1988
- Visitors: 86,591 (in 2025)
- Governing body: Texas Parks and Wildlife Department
- Website: Official site

Purtis Creek State Park is a 1,582.4-acre state park in Henderson and Van Zandt counties, Texas, United States. The park opened in 1988 under the authority of the Texas Parks and Wildlife Department (TPWD).

== History ==
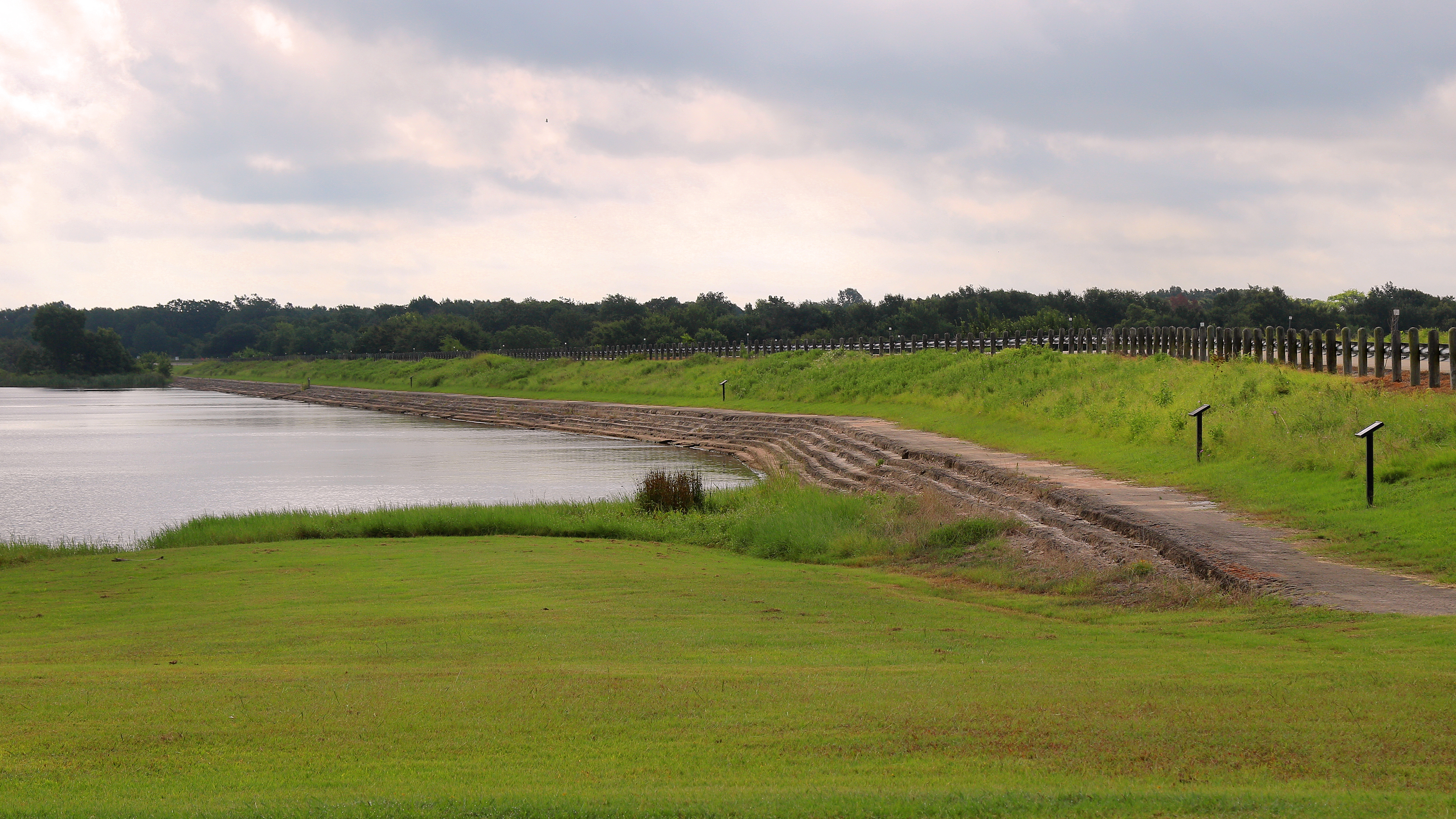
Purtis Creek State Park Lake dam.

Native Americans from the Wichita and Caddo tribes once hunted in the area. The abundance of game also drew settlers here in the early to mid-1800s. The TPWD purchased the park property in 1977 from private owners for $1.4 million. In 1980, The United States Soil Conservation Service built a dam on Purtis Creek to control floods and Purtis Creek State Park Lake was created. In 2009, the TPWD purchased approximately 2.5 acres with an existing gravel road across it to provide access to a remote area of the park not readily accessible from the existing park road system.

== Nature ==
=== Animals ===
The park surrounds the 355-acre Purtis Creek State Park Lake, which was designed for fishing. Fish species stocked in the lake include black bass, white bass, crappie, rainbow trout and blue, channel and flathead catfish. At some point, invasive grass carp were improperly released into the lake. Animals in the park include white-tailed deer, coyote and common raccoon along with birds such as northern cardinal, American crow, bald eagle, American white pelican and red-winged blackbird.

=== Plants ===
The park lies in the Oak Woodlands Natural Subregion of northeastern Texas. Some tree species documented in the park include post oak, black hickory, blackjack oak, winged elm, and eastern redcedar. Plants documented include mayapple, southern cattail and little bluestem.

== Activities ==
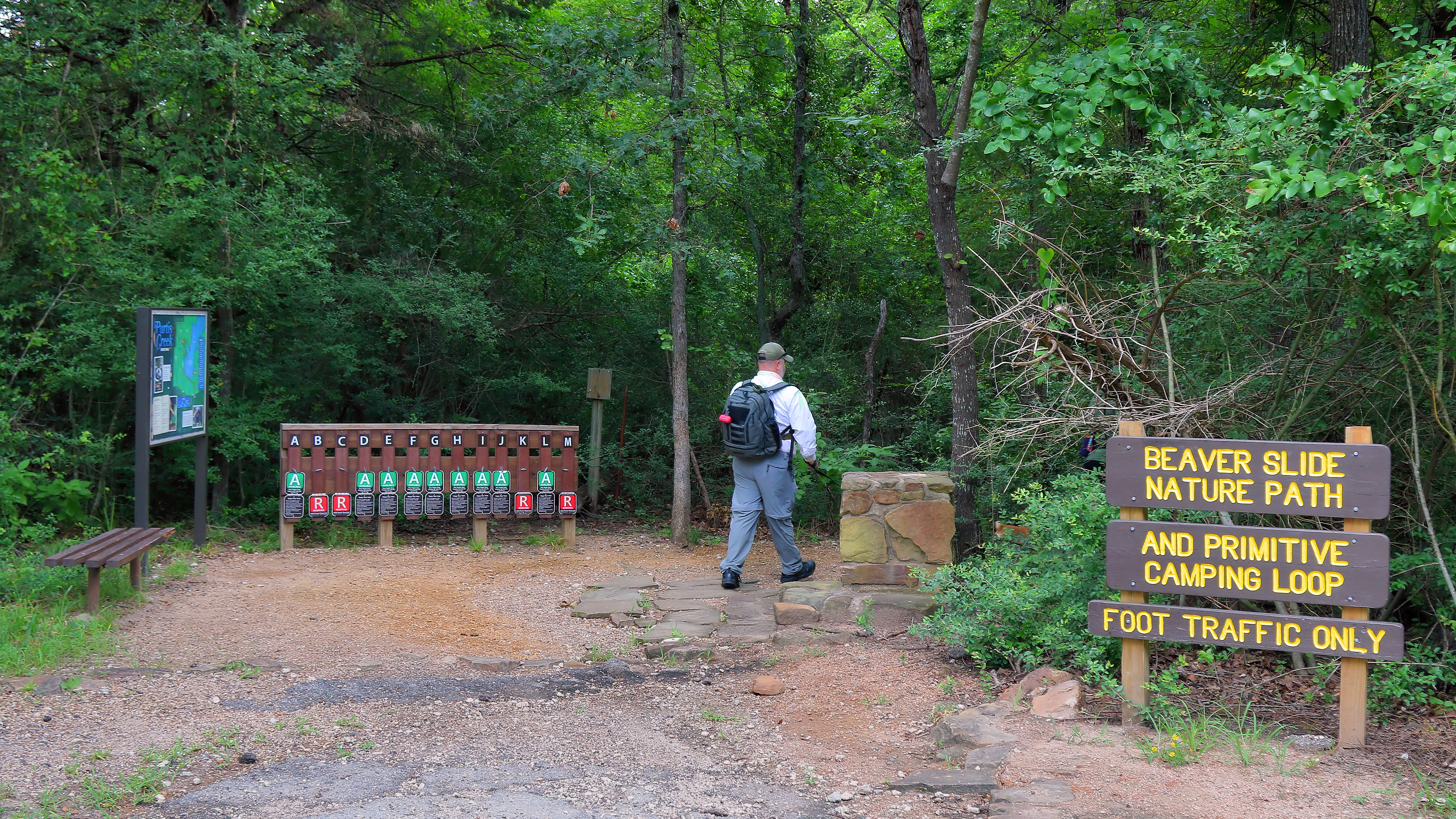
A hiker at the Beaver Slide Nature Path trailhead

Available activities at the park include boating, fishing, hiking, cycling, picnicing, geocaching, swimming and camping. There are tent sites with water and electricity and also primitive sites. The picnic area has tables, a covered pavilion and a playground. There is a boat ramp and dock as well as lighted fishing piers. A no-wake rule for motorized boats is enforced across the lake. There are almost six miles of trails with most designated for hiking and cycling. Swimming is only permitted in a designated swimming area.

== See also ==
- List of Texas state parks
