= Huntsville State Park =

State park in Texas, United States

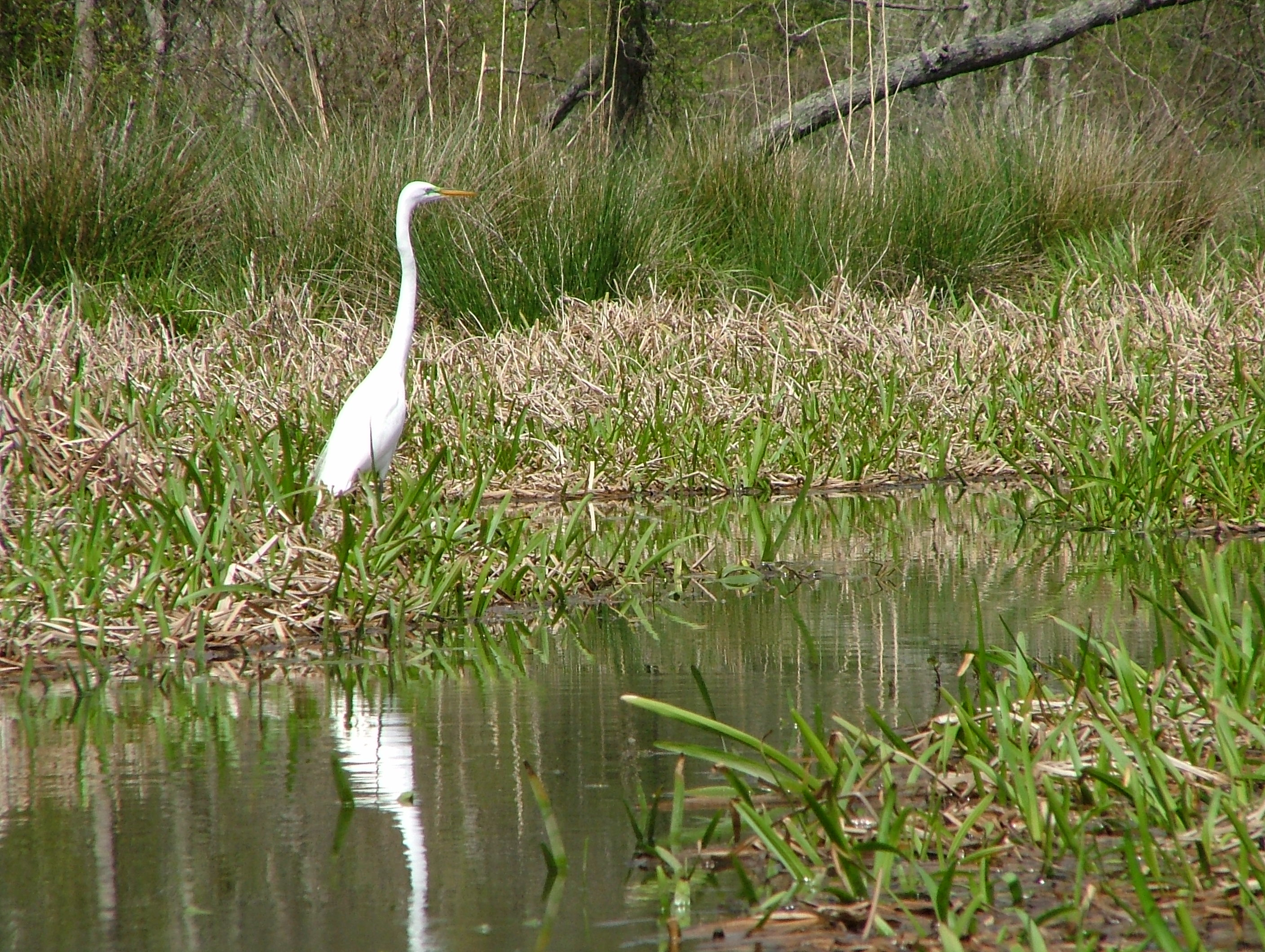
- A great egret at Lake Raven in Huntsville State Park

- Location within Texas Location within the United States
- Location: Walker County, Texas, United States
- Nearest city: Huntsville, Texas
- Coordinates: 30°37′10″N 95°31′50″W
- Area: 2,083 acres (843 ha)
- Created: 1956
- Visitors: 163,580 (in 2025)
- Operator: Texas Parks and Wildlife Department
- Website: Official site

Huntsville State Park is a 2,083.2-acre (843 ha) wooded recreational area, six miles (10 km) southwest of Huntsville, Texas, within Walker County, Texas, United States and the Sam Houston National Forest. The park opened in 1956 and is managed by the Texas Parks and Wildlife Department.

== History ==
The Bidai Indians were the first documented people in the area. Spaniards began exploring the area in the 17th century. Anglo-Americans founded the town of Huntsville in 1837. Logging boomed from around 1880 to 1920.

In the early 1930s, at a meeting of the Huntsville-Walker County Chamber of Commerce, it was suggested that a park be built around Huntsville. The Chamber of Commerce took the proposal to the Texas State Parks Board. The board required that the community provide the land for the park. Twenty thousand dollars in bonds would have to be sold by Walker County to pay for the land needed. In early 1936, the bond issue passed with more than four to one in favor of selling the bonds.

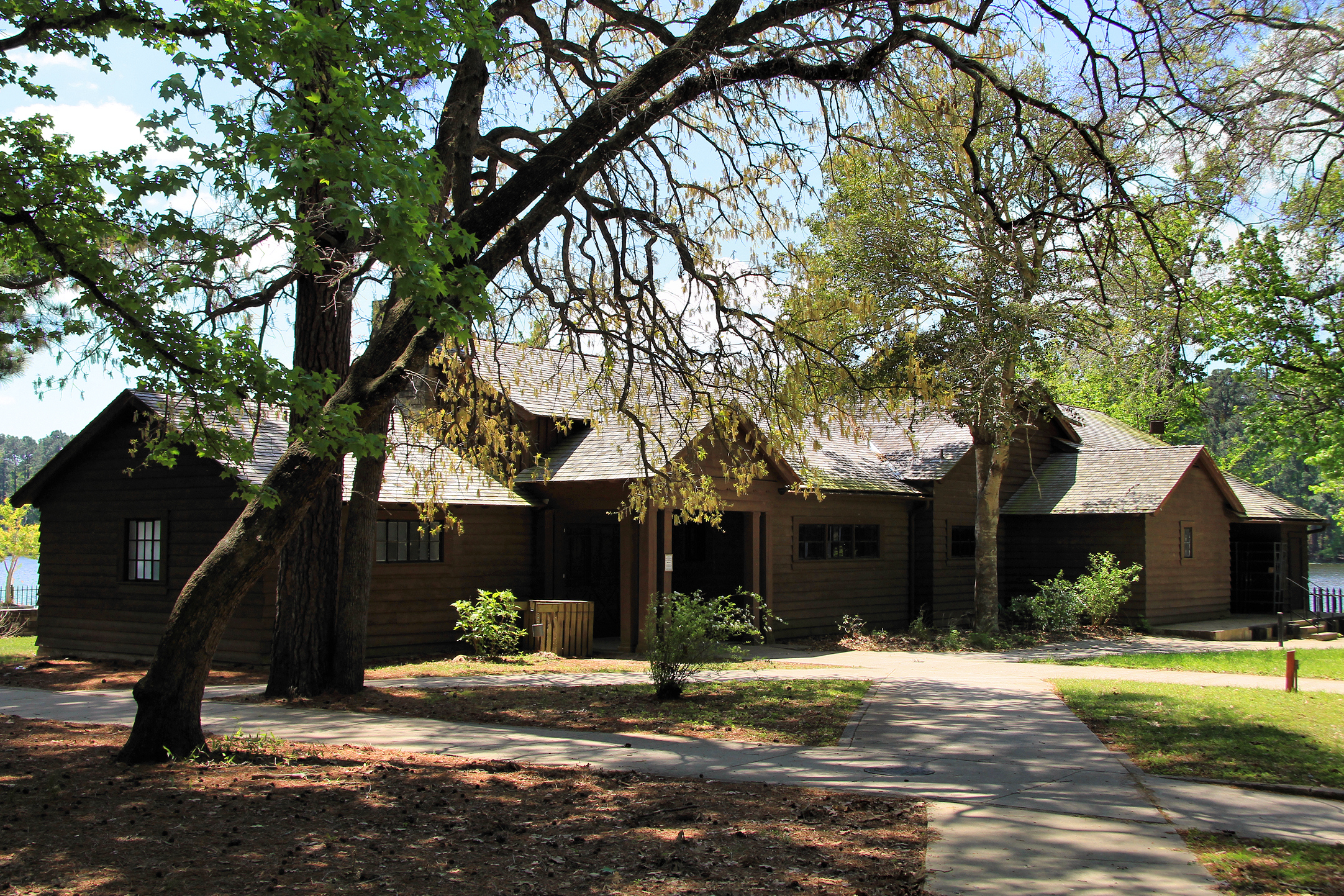
The Combination Building built by the Civilian Conservation Corps.

From 1937 to 1942, Civilian Conservation Corps (CCC) Company 1823(CV), an experienced company of African American World War I veterans, made initial improvements to the site, including construction of the combination building, the boat house, and the dam and spillway creating Lake Raven. The company also had to clear the future lake bed of standing timber before filling the lake and plant thousands of trees to replace the forest the logging industry had depleted. Other CCC projects in the park included a swimming platform, stone culverts, picnic areas, Lakeshore Road, a bridge, stone road-curbing, a well, water intake structure, and frame pump house. The spillway gave way after a 1940 flood and Lake Raven drained. This scuttled plans to build a bath house and cabins.

CCC Companies 873 and 1827 were assigned to the area between 1933 and 1937 for firefighting and flood control. They also built unpaved roads within the park, which have mostly grown over.

With the start of World War II, the CCC's work ended, but Works Progress Administration workers and prison laborers completed projects that included building roads and water and septic systems, allowing limited use of the park in summer months during the war.

A private contractor began repairs on the dam in 1955 and it was completed in April, 1956. The Huntsville-Walker County Chamber of Commerce dedicated and opened Huntsville State Park to the public on Friday, May 18, 1956.

== Nature ==
=== Animals ===
White-tailed deer, common raccoon, Virginia opossum, Mexican long-nosed armadillo, eastern gray squirrel and fox squirrel live in the park. 218 species of birds have been documented either on the ground or flying over the park. Common species observed include black vulture, turkey vulture, American coot, red-bellied woodpecker, downy woodpecker, pileated woodpecker, blue jay, common crow, Carolina chickadee, brown-headed nuthatch, Carolina wren, eastern bluebird, pine warbler and northern cardinal. Lake Raven has redear sunfish, bluegill, flathead catfish, channel catfish, largemouth bass, yellow bass and white bass. Occasionally alligators have been spotted in the lake.

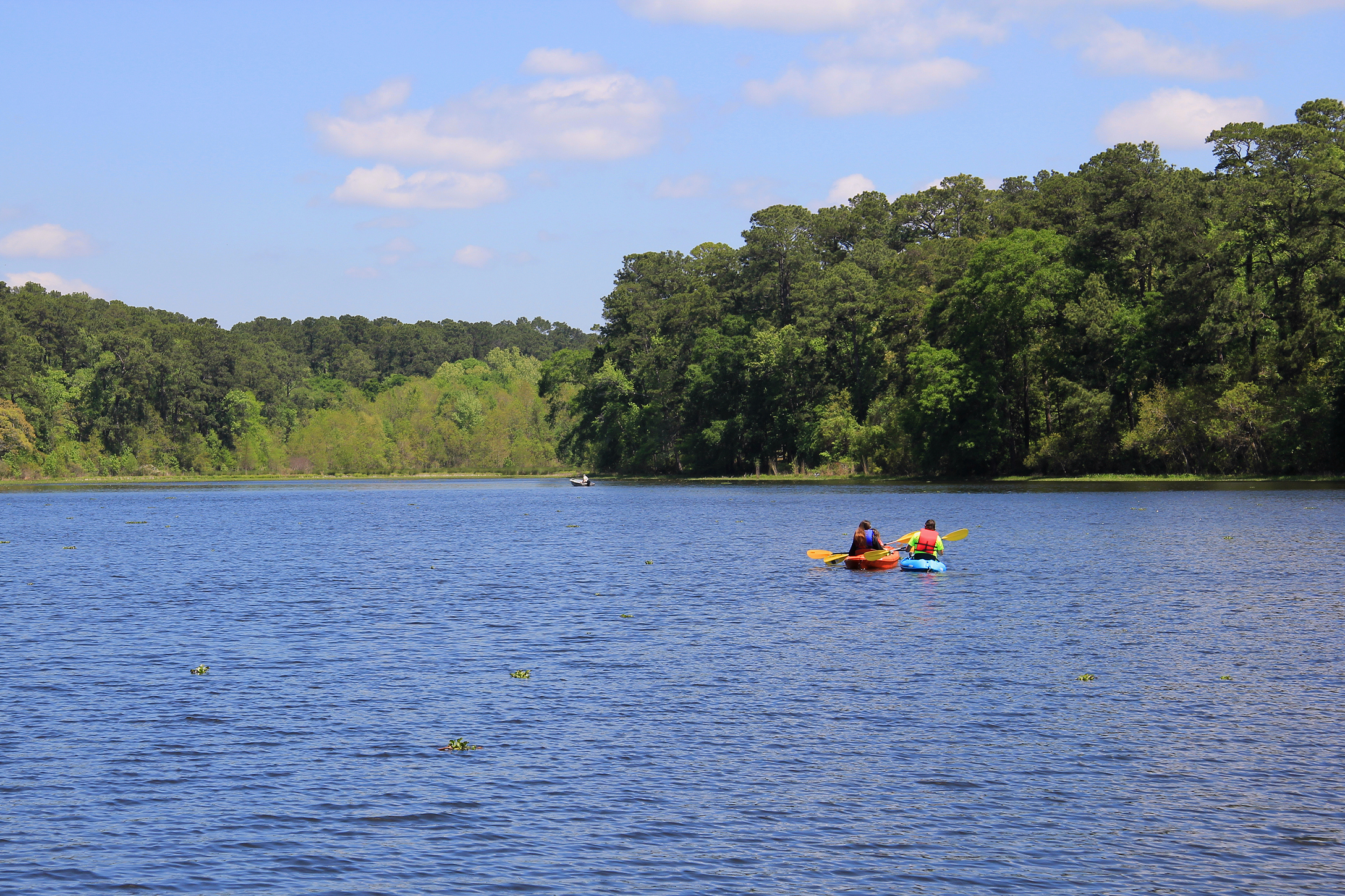
Paddling and fishing are popular activities on Lake Raven.

=== Flora ===
The park is dominated by loblolly pine and shortleaf pine trees along with southern red oak, American sweetgum and youpon holly in the uplands. Along the creeks, water oak, American white oak and blackgum form the canopy. Flowering plants such dogwood, American beautyberry and Turk’s cap bloom at various times throughout the year.

== Activities ==
Activities in the park include camping, hiking, cycling, picnicking, fishing, swimming, paddling, and geocaching. There are over twenty miles of trails, playgrounds, a bird blind and nature center.

== See also ==
- List of Texas state parks
