= Lake Colorado City State Park =

State park in Texas, United States

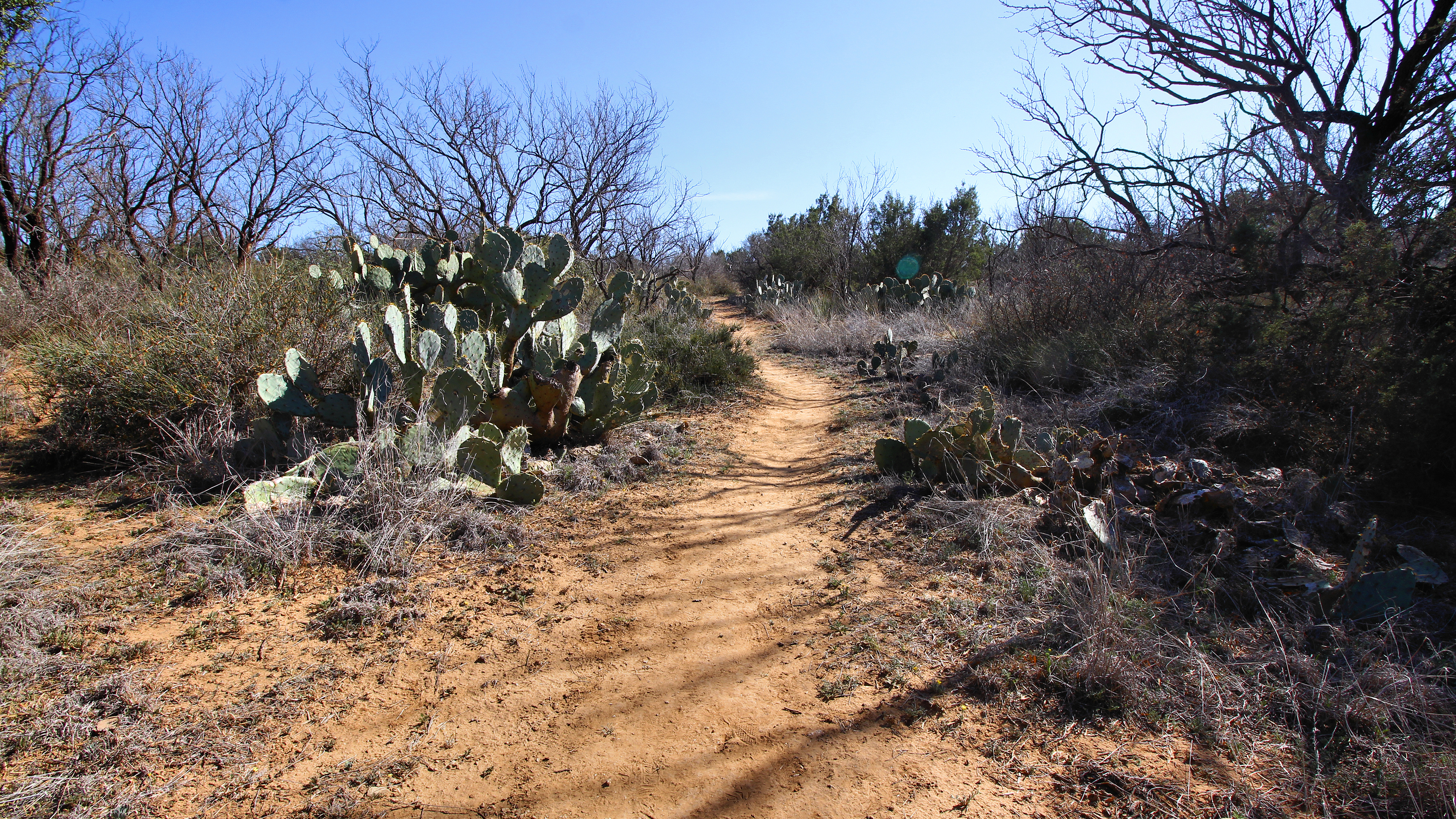
- Along the Cactus Cut Trail

- Location within Texas Location within the United States
- Location: Mitchell County, Texas
- Nearest city: Colorado City
- Coordinates: 32°19′6″N 100°56′11″W
- Area: 500 acres (200 ha)
- Established: 1972
- Visitors: 22,290 (in 2025)
- Governing body: Texas Parks and Wildlife Department
- Website: Official site

←

Lake Colorado City State Park is a 500-acre state park southwest of Colorado City in Mitchell County, Texas, United States and is administered by the Texas Parks and Wildlife Department (TPWD). Lake Colorado City State Park is located on Lake Colorado City, a reservoir on Morgan Creek, a tributary of the Colorado River. The park opened in 1972.

== History ==
Lake Colorado City was developed in 1949 by damming Morgan Creek. A power station being built needed the reservoir water to cool its generators. TPWD leased the land for the park for 99 years in 1971 from the utility company. Between 2012 and 2014, the park averaged 7,643 visits per year. That number jumped to an average of 27,817 between 2019 and 2021, the peak years of the COVID-19 pandemic in Texas. TPWD acquired ownership of the park from Vistra Corp. in 2024.

== Nature ==
Lake Colorado City State Park lies in the Rolling Plains ecoregion of Texas and originally consisted mostly of grassland. Honey mesquite has since taken over as the dominant plant. TPWD periodically carries out a controlled burn to eliminate the mesquite and return the land to open prairie.

=== Plants ===
The most common plants in the park are prickly pear and mesquite. Many types of wildflowers make an appearance in the spring.

=== Animals ===
Mammals in the park include porcupine, gray fox, coyote, bobcat, white-tail deer, raccoon, badger and skunk. Reptiles found in the park are Texas horned lizard, Texas spiny lizard, six-lined racerunner and western diamondback rattlesnake.

More than 300 bird species have been sighted in the park. Northern mockingbird, cactus wren, mourning dove, house finch, canyon towhee, northern bobwhite, scaled quail, golden-fronted woodpecker ladder-backed woodpecker, and curve-billed thrasher can be seen in the park year-round. American coot and pied-billed grebe nest near the lake in winter.

== Recreation ==
Activities at the park include fishing, swimming, paddleboarding, kayaking, camping, picnicking, hiking and geocaching.

== See also ==
- List of Texas state parks
