= Lockhart State Park =

State park in Texas, United States

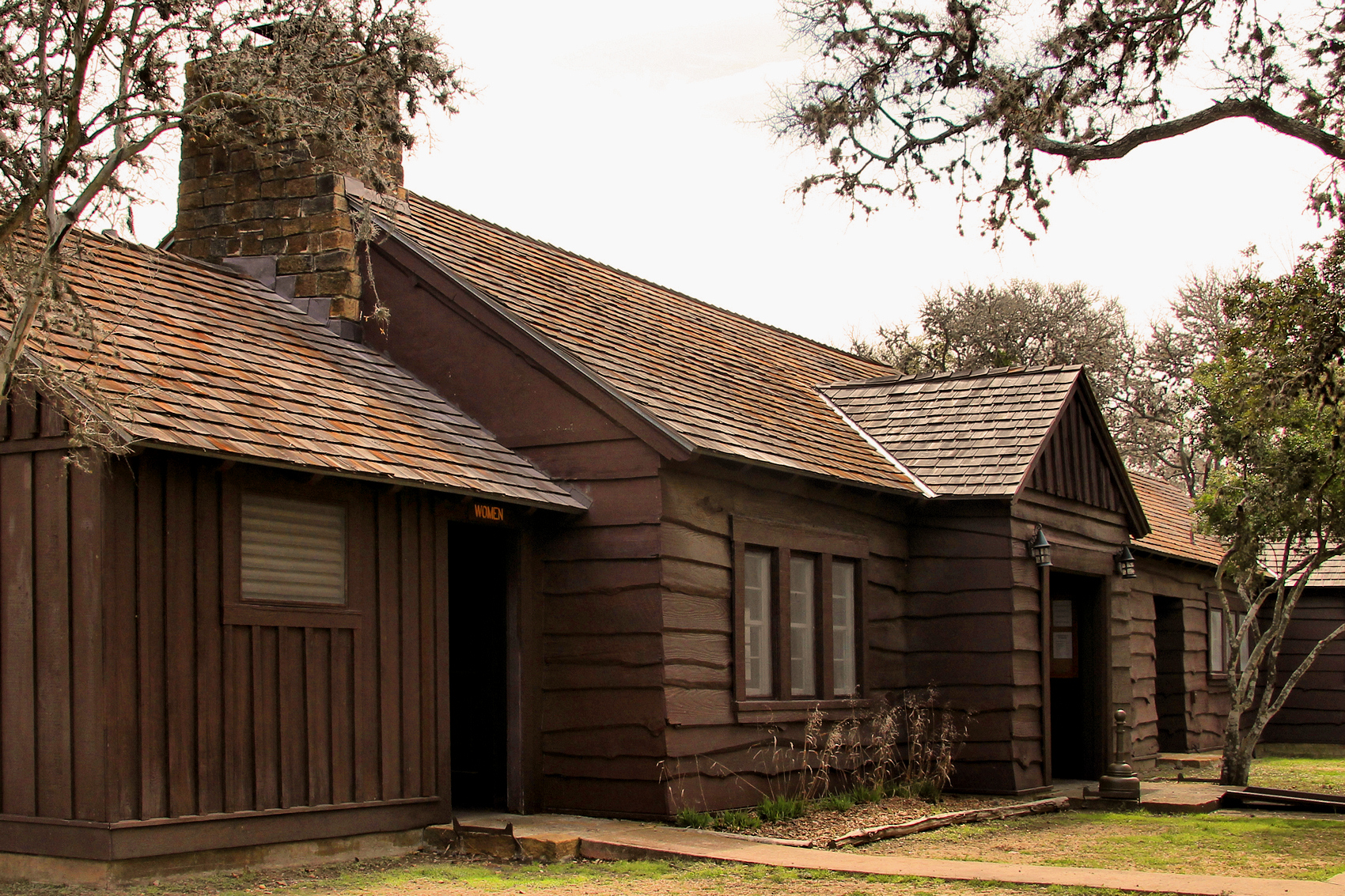
- The Lockhart State Park Recreation Hall. The building was designed by Olin Smith and constructed by Civilian Conservation Corps Company 3803 circa 1936.

- Location within Texas Location within the United States
- Location: Caldwell County, Texas
- Nearest city: Lockhart
- Coordinates: 29°51′19″N 97°41′52″W
- Area: 453 acres (183 ha)
- Established: 1948
- Visitors: 74,469 (in 2025)
- Governing body: Texas Parks and Wildlife Department
- Website: Official site

Lockhart State Park is a 453 acres (183 ha) state park located at the southwestern edge of Lockhart, Texas, United States and is administered by the Texas Parks and Wildlife Department. The park was constructed by Civilian Conservation Corps (CCC) Company 3803 between 1935 and 1938. The park officially became a state park in 1948 and is managed by the Texas Parks and Wildlife Department.

== History ==
Native Americans occupied this area long before it was a park. As was the case in much of the Americas, it was not long before conflict between settlers and Native Americans arose. Shortly after Texas independence in 1840, as retaliation for the Council House Fight, a large contingent of Comanches, led by the Penateka Comanche War Chief Buffalo Hump, raided, plundered, and burned towns and homesteads from the Guadalupe River valley southwards to the coast at Matagorda Bay.

On their eventual withdrawal, a volunteer army of Texas militia, allied Tonkawa, and Texas Rangers overtook the Comanche near the present town of Lockhart. The famous Battle of Plum Creek took place just a few miles north of the park; informative panels within the park detail its history and events. The battle was more of a running gun fight than a staged battle in the traditional sense. As the larger Comanche raiding party attempted to escape with their plundered goods and livestock, warriors engaged in rearguard skirmishes with the pursuing militia.

In purely military terms, it is arguable whether there was a victor in the battle, as the Comanche escaped with the majority of their plunder, while an unverifiable number of casualties was reported. What is notable about the battle is that it marked the last large scale Comanche raid to venture beyond the Texan frontier.

== Construction ==
The park initially consisted of 263.7 acres of land along the Clear Fork of the Plum Creek that was purchased by the State of Texas from Henry Masur on December 14, 1934. The land was set aside for the express purpose of creating public recreational facilities by the men of the Civilian Conservation Corps (CCC).

Work on the park began in 1935 by Company 3803. The design plan called for stonework and timber beam construction in a style reminiscent of early Texas frontier homesteads. Examples include the park's residence building, the recreation hall, a stone arch bridge, an elevated concrete water storage tank, a series of stone dams, stone trail head steps, culverts, picnic tables, and outdoor fire rings. A swimming pool was also built along the banks of Clear Fork Creek, but due to routine flooding of the creek, the original swimming pool was filled in and a new swimming pool built uphill from the creek in 1970's. Finally, a 9-hole golf course was planned for in the original blueprints of the park, but because the CCC was limited to work of a conservational nature, that project was reserved for another New Deal program, the Works Progress Administration (WPA). The CCC did clear the land for the golf course project.

Construction of the park was completed by the CCC in 1938; the golf course was completed by 1941. After completion, the park was initially leased to a local country club until 1948, when it was officially opened to the public as a state park.

In 2026, the park expanded its boundaries by 188 acres by acquiring 148 acres southeast of the park and 40 acres to the northeast from private owners. The Nature Conservancy partnered with the Texas Parks and Wildlife Department to secure the parcels.

== Features ==
Clear Fork Creek, a tributary of the larger Plum Creek, runs through the middle of the park. A series of small stone check dams were constructed by the CCC to provide areas for recreational fishing. Fish species tend to be bass, catfish, and sunfish. A free loaner pole and tackle program is available within the park.

The park features roughly four miles of designated trails that cover a wide range of environments. In addition to multiple short, shade covered trails along the creek in a riparian zone, a network of natural trails traversing multiple hillsides and ravines is located on the backside of the park. A moderate degree of elevation change can be experienced, but no trails are rated higher than moderate difficulty. Mountain biking is allowed on designated trails. Other activities include picnicking, camping, swimming, and golfing.

=== Animals ===
White-tailed deer are the most frequently spotted creatures in the park, but common raccoon, Virginia opossum, Mexican long-nosed armadillo, nutria, North American beaver, eastern cottontail, eastern fox squirrel, coyote, bobcat, and gray fox also call the park home. Wild turkey are also sighted occasionally. Hikers need to be wary of the parks two most dangerous inhabitants, rattlesnakes and coral snakes. Invasive species such as feral pig have caused the park a great deal of damage and, while not welcomed, are common.

=== Plants ===
Trees in the park include Texas red oak, Texas kidneywood, eastern red cedar, honey mesquite, Mexican plum, Hercules' club, live oak, black walnut, and Texas persimmon. Shrubs like elbow bush, chile pequin, Texas lantana, rusty blackhaw, Spanish dagger and fragrant sumac flourish in the rich soil along with plants such as Turk's cap, Virginia creeper and several species of greenbriar. Plains prickly pear and tasajillo cactus and native grasses such as little bluestem can be found in open areas.

== Gallery ==
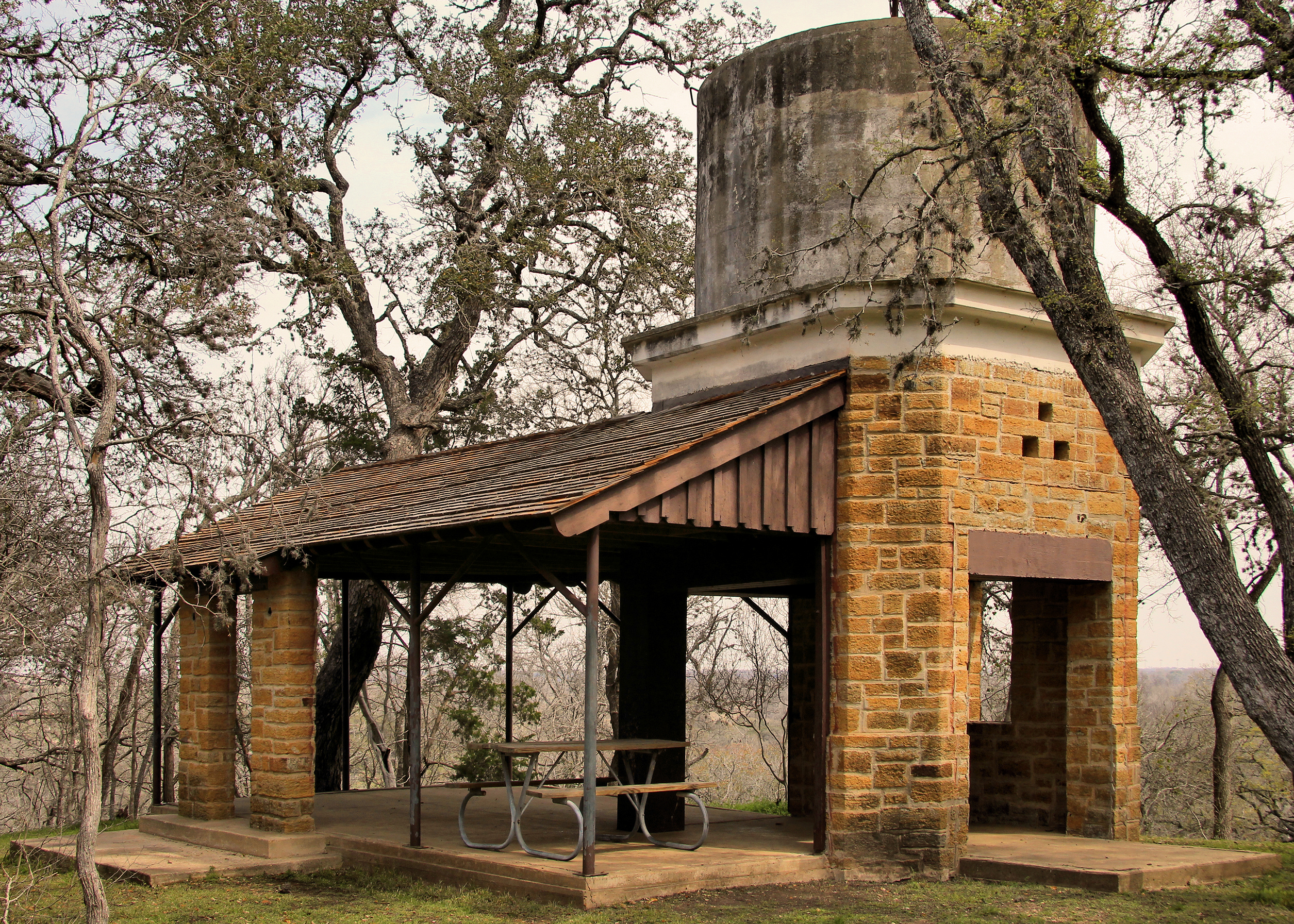
The water tower was designed by architect George T. Patrick and built by the CCC.

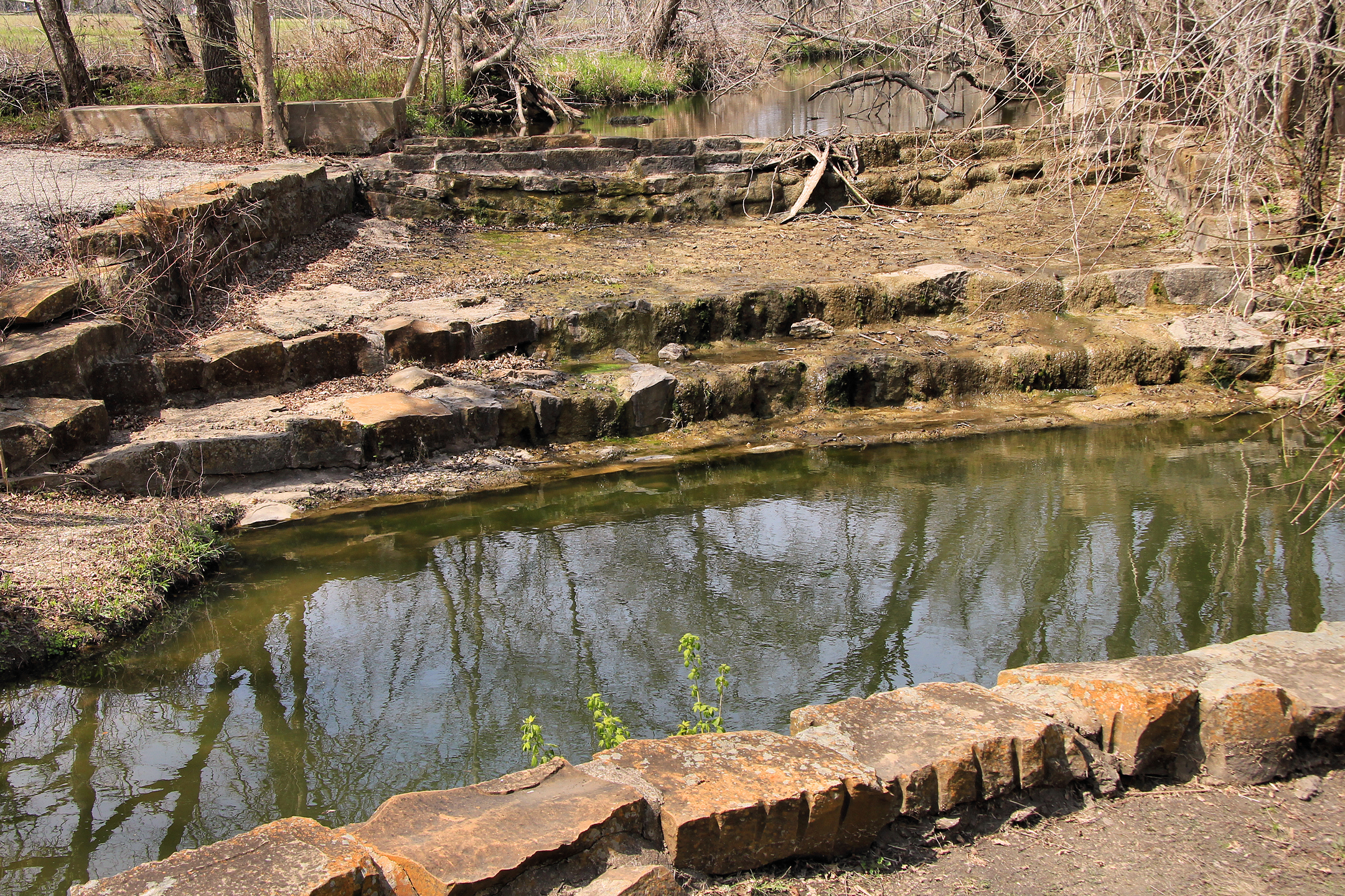
The CCC built several dams in the park. This dam acts as a waterfall when the creek is flowing and provides a fishing hole at its base.

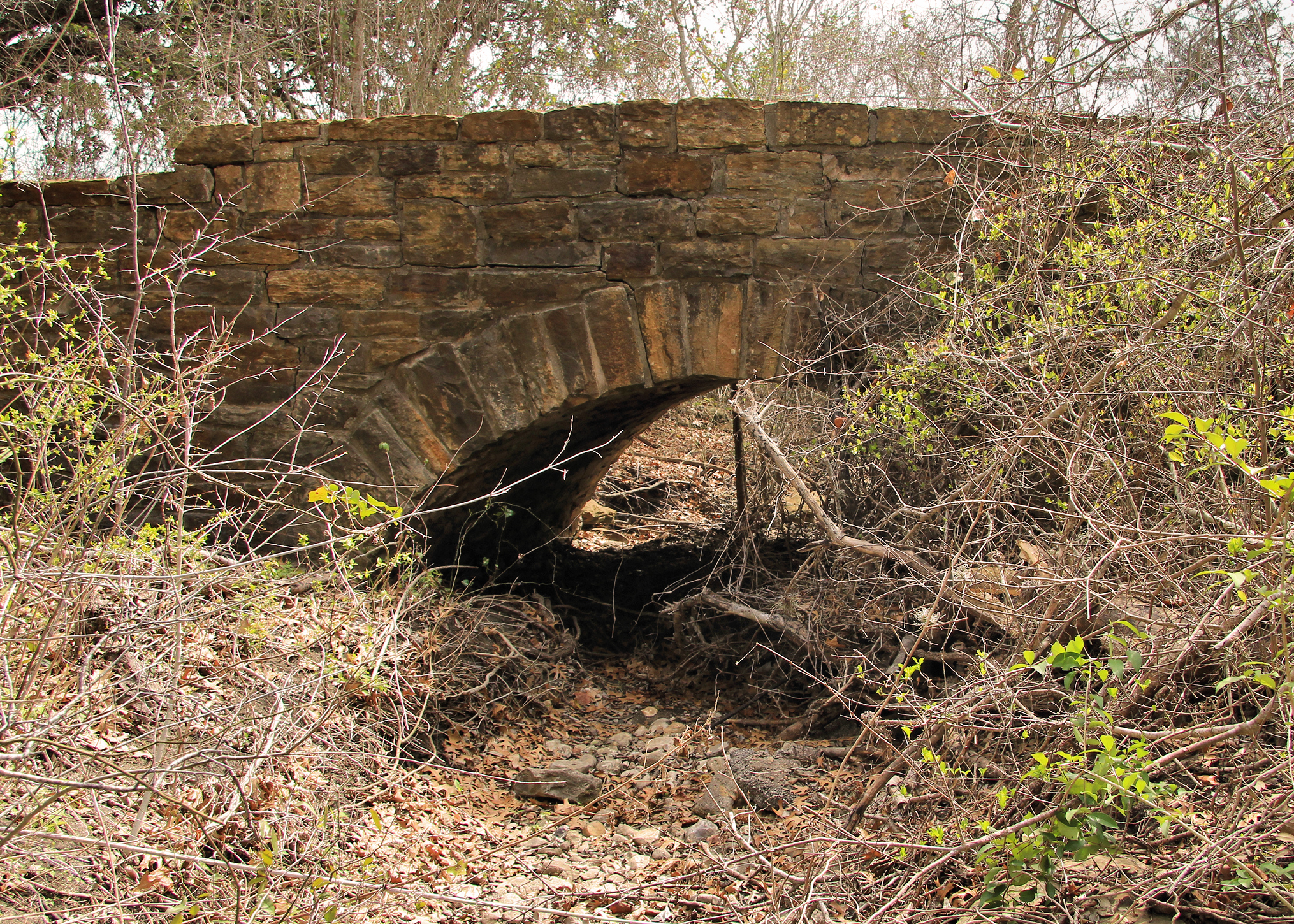
The CCC built many culverts and bridges while constructing Park Road 10, which winds up a hill to the recreation hall.

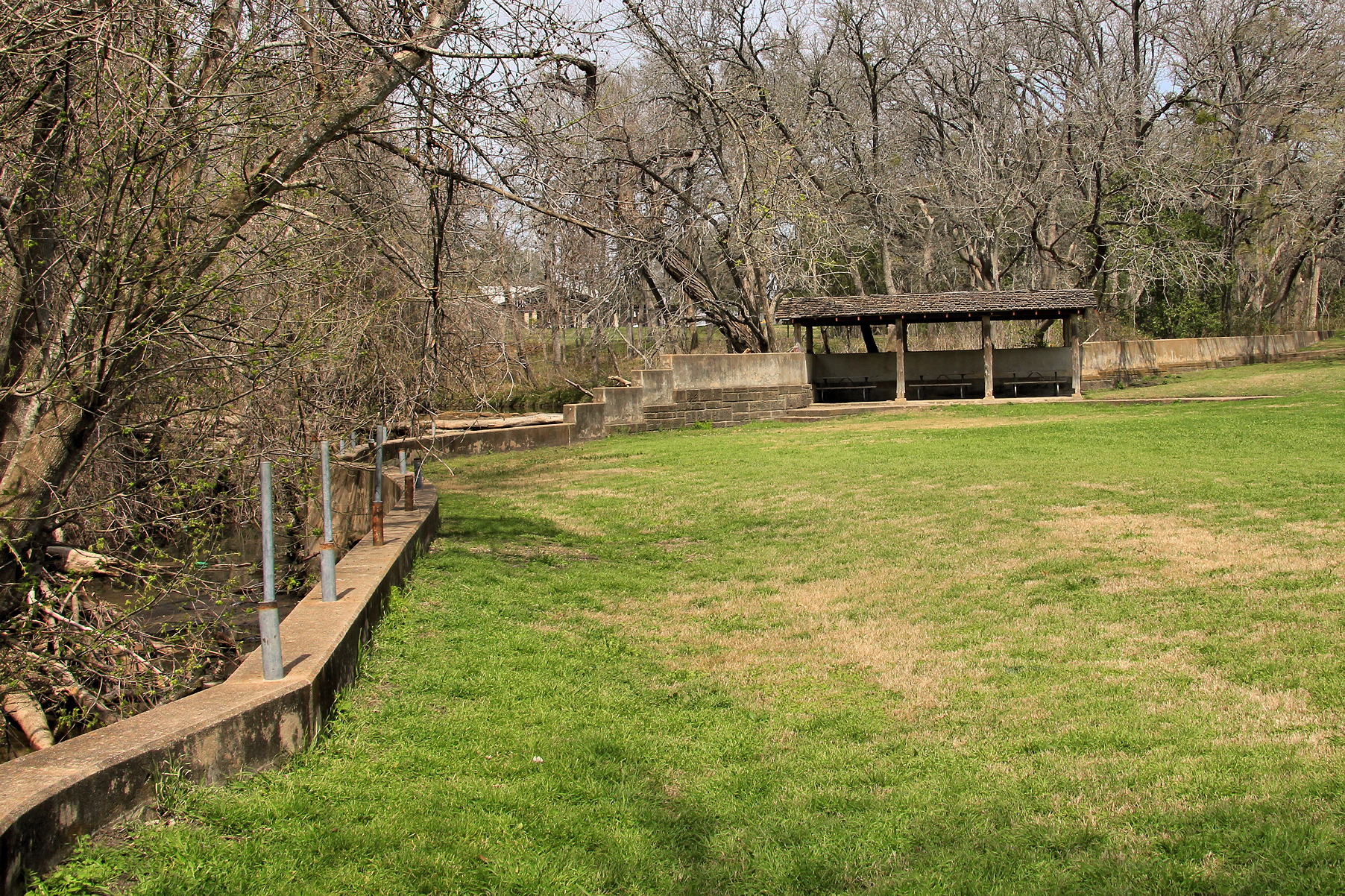
The outline of the CCC built swimming pool that was filled in in the 1970s.

== See also ==
- List of Texas state parks
