= Devils River State Natural Area =

Protected area in Texas, United States

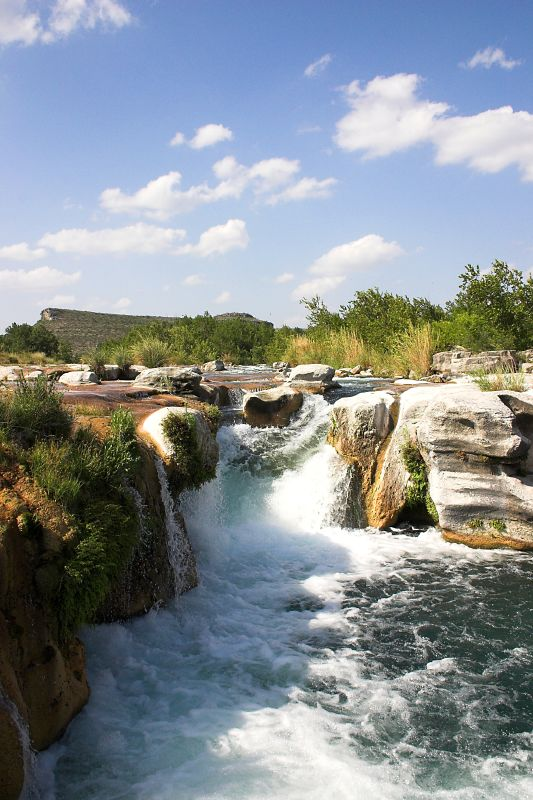
- Dolan Falls
- Map showing Del Norte Unit (top), Dan A. Hughes Unit (bottom) and the route of the Devils River (blue)
- Location: Val Verde County, USA
- Nearest city: Del Rio, Texas
- Coordinates: 29°55′22.84″N 100°58′13.18″W
- Area: 37,000 acres (15,000 ha)
- Established: 1988
- Visitors: 7,883 (in 2025)
- Governing body: Texas Parks and Wildlife Department
- Website: Official site

Devils River State Natural Area is a 37,000-acre (15,000 ha) nature reserve consisting of the sections of three ecosystems, the Edwards Plateau, the Tamaulipan mezquital and the Chihuahuan Desert. It is located in Val Verde County, Texas, United States. Named for the whitewater Devils River that runs alongside it, the Devils River State Natural Area's original boundaries were once part of a 20,000 acre working ranch that Texas Parks and Wildlife Department purchased in 1988. This area is now known as the Del Norte Unit.

In 2011, Texas Parks and Wildlife Department purchased an additional 18,000 acres 13 miles south of the Del Norte Unit for $13 million, $9 million of which came from donations. This section is known as the Dan A. Hughes Unit in honor of Dan A. Hughes, who led the fundraising efforts. The Del Norte Unit opened to the public in early 2025.

Devils River State Natural Area is a remote location surrounded by private ranches. Floating on the river is a three-day trip, with no modern conveniences available. While campsites are available, campers are advised to bring all basic necessities with them. Visitors are required to remove everything they bring into the area.

== History ==
In 1857, future Confederate General John Bell Hood and a small United States Cavalry force skirmished with a group of Comanche braves along the banks of the Devil's River. In 1873, Texas Ranger Captain Pat Dolan had a skirmish with Native Americans, at the falls named for him. Dolan Falls in the natural area is the highest volume waterfall in Texas. The area was once home to the Comanche, Kiowa and Kickapoo tribes. Pictographs painted with red panthers are found in the area's fifty-three rock shelters, which archeologists have dated to 3000 BCE. The "Buffalo dancer" pictograph depicts a Native American.

== Nature ==
The area is home to many varieties of animals and plants, including the Mexican free-tailed bat and black-capped vireo as well as Texas live oak, pecan and American sycamore trees.

== See also ==
- List of Texas state parks
- List of Texas state historic sites

== Notes ==
=== References ===
- Aulbach, Louis F. (2005). The Devils River. Wilderness Area Map Service. ISBN 978-0976521334.
- Kowtko, Stacy S. (2010). America's Natural Places: South and Southeast. Greenwood Press/ABC-CLIO. ISBN 9780313350894.
- Parent, Laurence (2008). Official Guide to Texas State Parks and Historic Sites. University of Texas Press. ISBN 978-0-292-71726-8.
