= Albert and Bessie Kronkosky State Natural Area =

State park in Texas, United States

- IUCN category V (protected landscape/seascape)
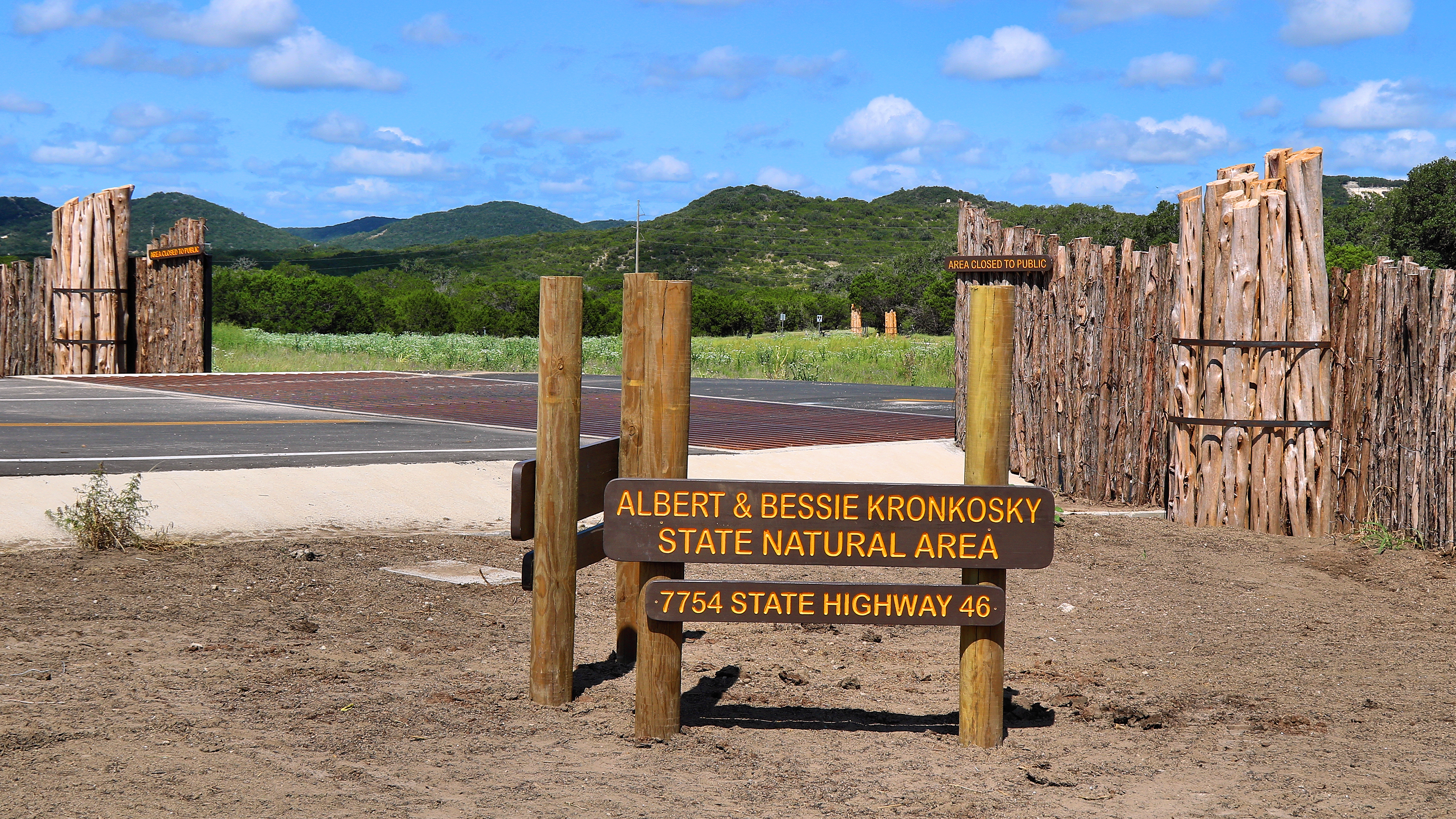
- Future entrance to the park

- Location within Texas Location within the United States
- Location: Bandera County and Kendall County, Texas, United States
- Nearest city: Boerne
- Coordinates: 29°44′25″N 98°50′17″W
- Area: 3,814 acres (15.43 km^{2})
- Established: 2011
- Governing body: Texas Parks and Wildlife Department
- Website: Official site

Albert and Bessie Kronkosky State Natural Area is a 3,814-acre (1,543 ha) state park in Bandera and Kendall counties, Texas, United States. The park is under development and is managed by the Texas Parks and Wildlife Department. The opening date is planned for December 1, 2026 for day use and December 15, 2026, for overnight camping. The park is named for Albert and Bessie Kronkosky who donated the land for the park.

== History ==
Albert and Bessie Kronkosky began buying property for themselves in 1946. By 1973, their holdings had grown to 3,814 acres. The couple willed the land to the State of Texas to protect it from development. The Texas Parks and Wildlife Department accepted the donation of the ranch in March 2011.

The State of Texas invested approximately $29 million for development. Marmon Mok Architecture was the design firm for the park with Byrne Construction Services leading the build team. DHM Design served as the landscape architect.

The United States Fish and Wildlife Service provided $130,000 to remove an earthen dam that will reopen 3.7 miles of creek on the property.

== Activities ==
The park will offer camping in cabins, screened shelters, traditional tent sites and backcountry campsites, hiking and backpacking over 28 miles of trails, three of which are ADA accessible and some multi-use for cycling. The park will host programs in a 100-person amphitheater and a nature center.

== Nature ==
The park has several rare or endangered species such as golden-cheeked warbler, Texas alligator lizard, hairy sycamore-leaf snowbell, bigtooth maple, Boerne bean and Texas spring salamander. White-tailed deer, black-tailed jackrabbit and common raccoon are more common species in the park.

== See also ==
- List of Texas state parks
