= Colorado Bend State Park =

State park in Texas, United States

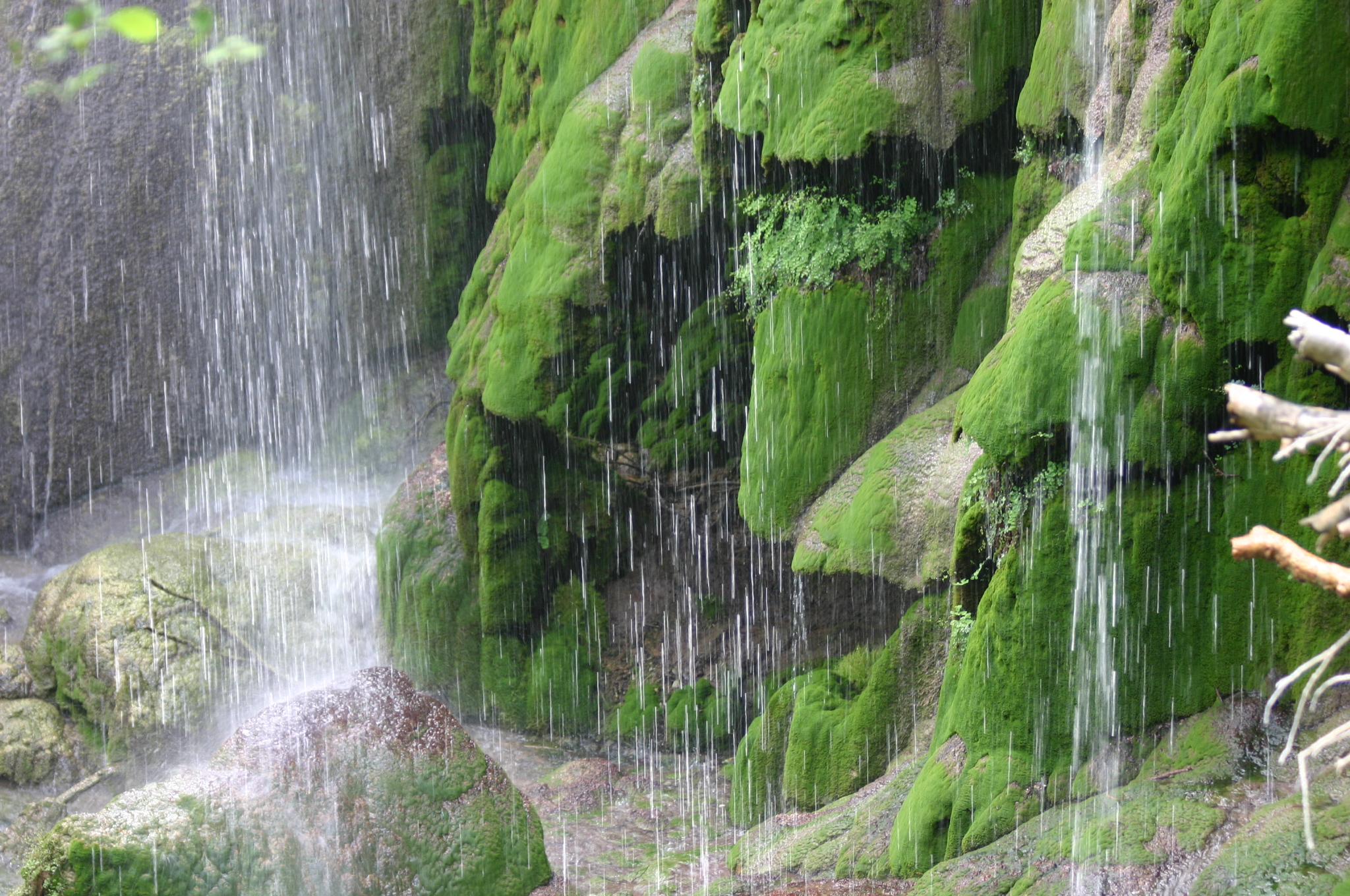
- Base of the Gorman Falls
- Location: San Saba County, Texas, Lampasas County, Texas
- Nearest city: San Saba, Texas
- Coordinates: 31°3′14″N 98°29′32″W
- Area: 5,328.3 acres (2,156 ha)
- Established: 1984
- Visitors: 56,704 (in 2025)
- Governing body: Texas Parks and Wildlife Department
- Website: Official site

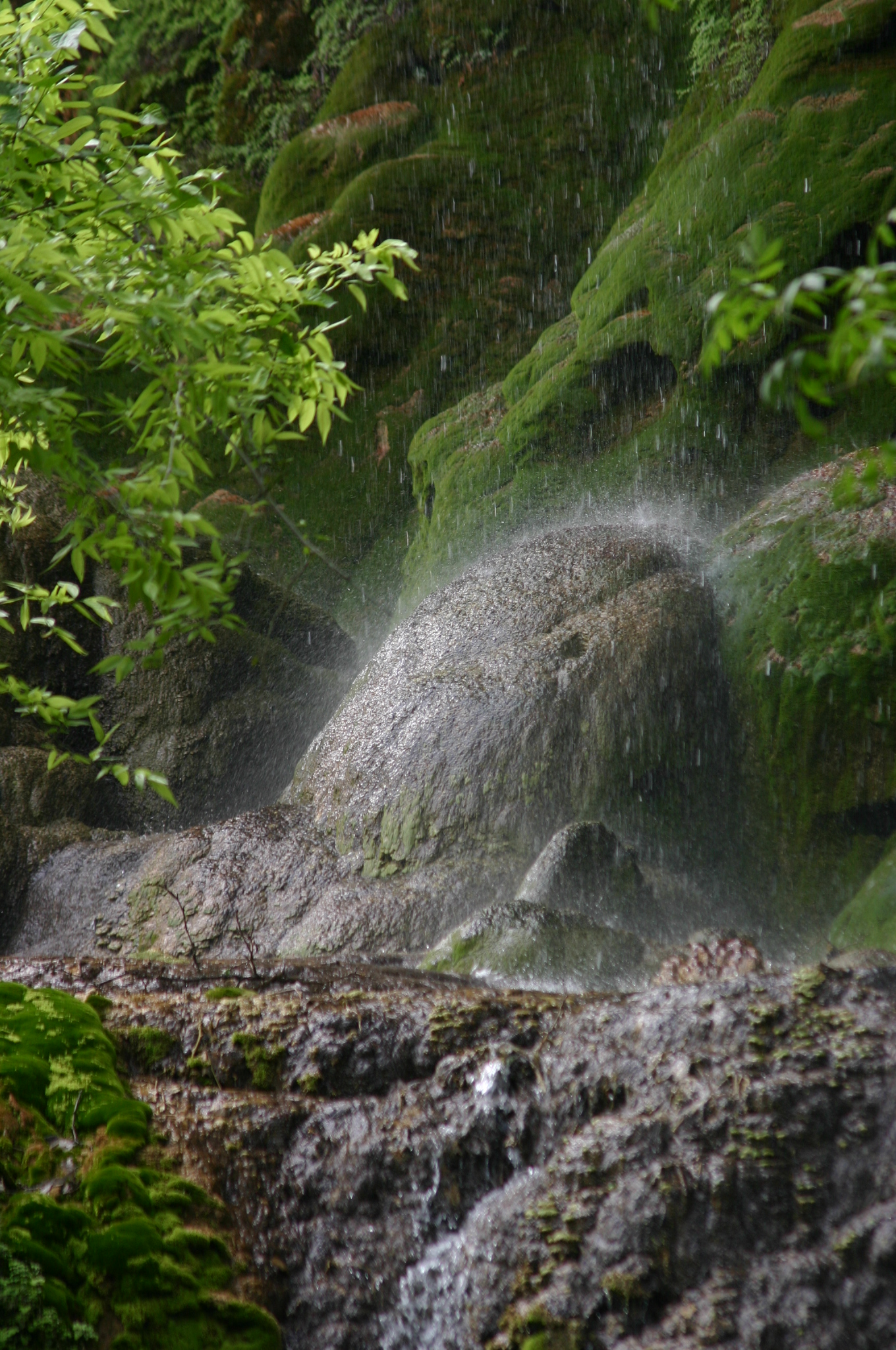
Beneath the Gorman Falls

Colorado Bend State Park is a 5,328.3-acre (2,156 ha) state park on the Colorado River mostly in San Saba County, Texas, United States. The smaller part in Lampasas County has no public access. The State of Texas purchased the land in 1984, and the park opened to the public in 1987. The Texas Parks and Wildlife Department manages the park.

== Hiking trails ==
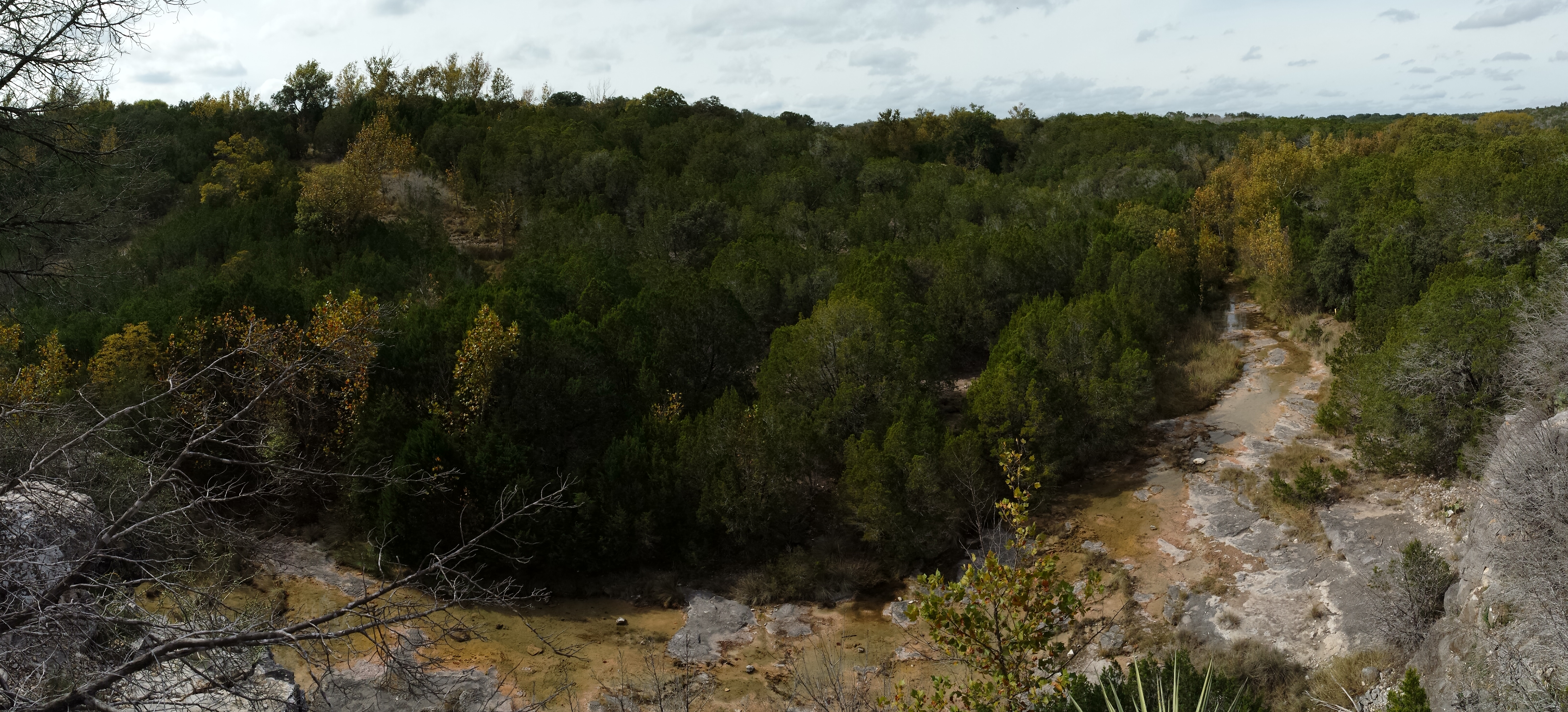
View of Spicewood Springs taken along the Spicewood Springs trail

The Spicewood Springs trail, one of the hiking trails in the park, has numerous creek crossings. The trail is 2.5-mile (4.0 km)-long one way, but hikers can take a slightly different hike back. It has numerous spring-fed swimming holes along the trail.

The Gorman Creek trail is divided into a blue-marker loop and a yellow-marker loop, with dry chaparral terrain. The highlights of the park trails are a travertine creek on the east, and a large waterfall with caves on the west. A protected portion of the park is open by guided tour only. The Gorman Spring and a few other springs feed Gorman Creek, which then descends a spectacular 65 feet (20 m), forming what is known as Gorman Falls. The tour is a 1.5-mile (2.4 km) round-trip trail leading to the spectacular waterfall, which is formed by fern-covered travertine. The self-guided Gorman Spring trail and the trail to the waterfall are now open to the public during regular park hours. Also, many wild-cave tour opportunities are available, ranging in difficulty from walking to crawling.

== Nature ==
The park has many of the karst features typically seen in the Texas Hill Country, with many sinkholes, caves, and springs.

=== Plants ===
A variety of flowers can be found in Colorado Bend State Park.

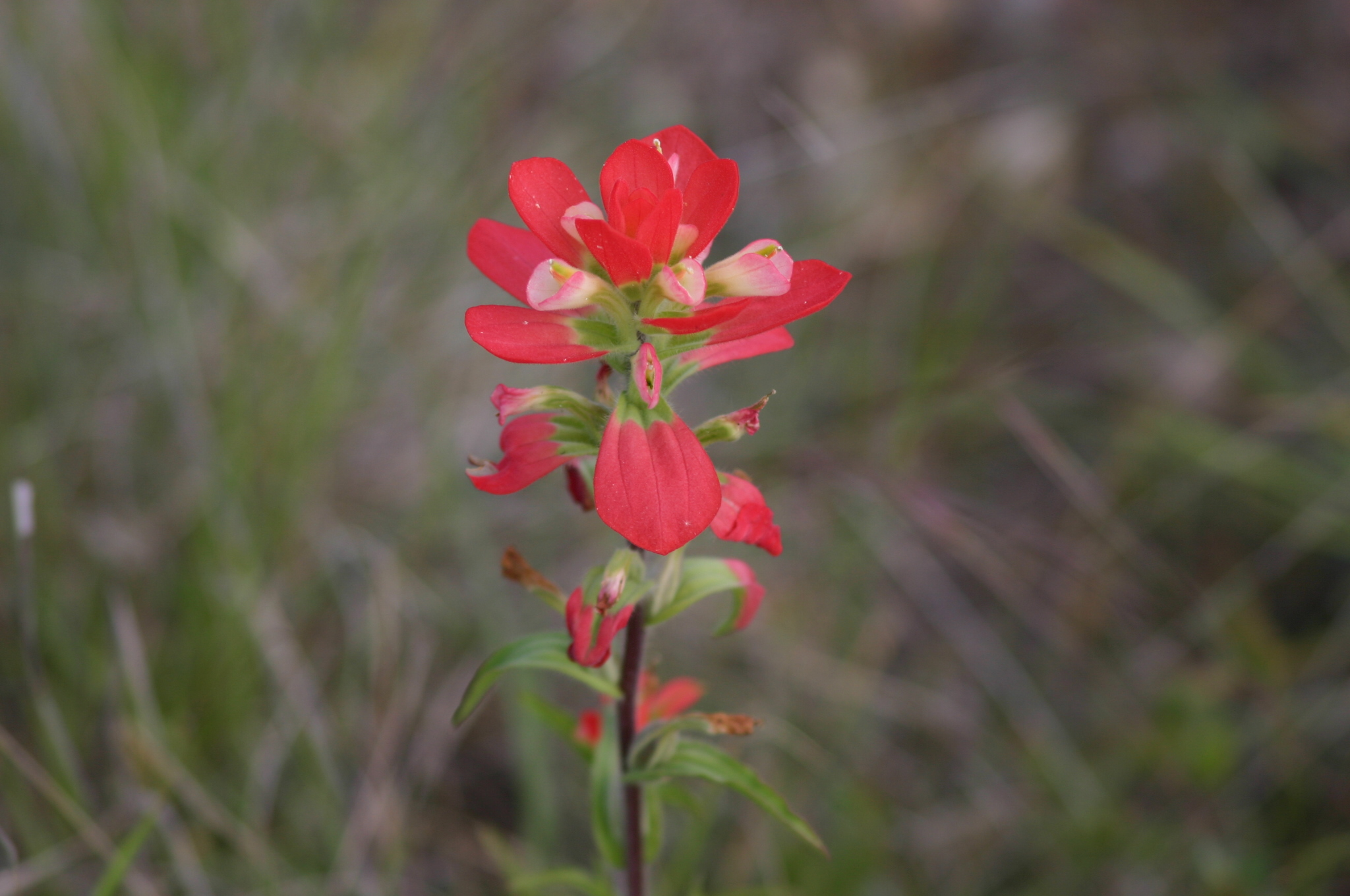
Castilleja indivisa
Indian paintbrush, taken along Gorman Creek Trail

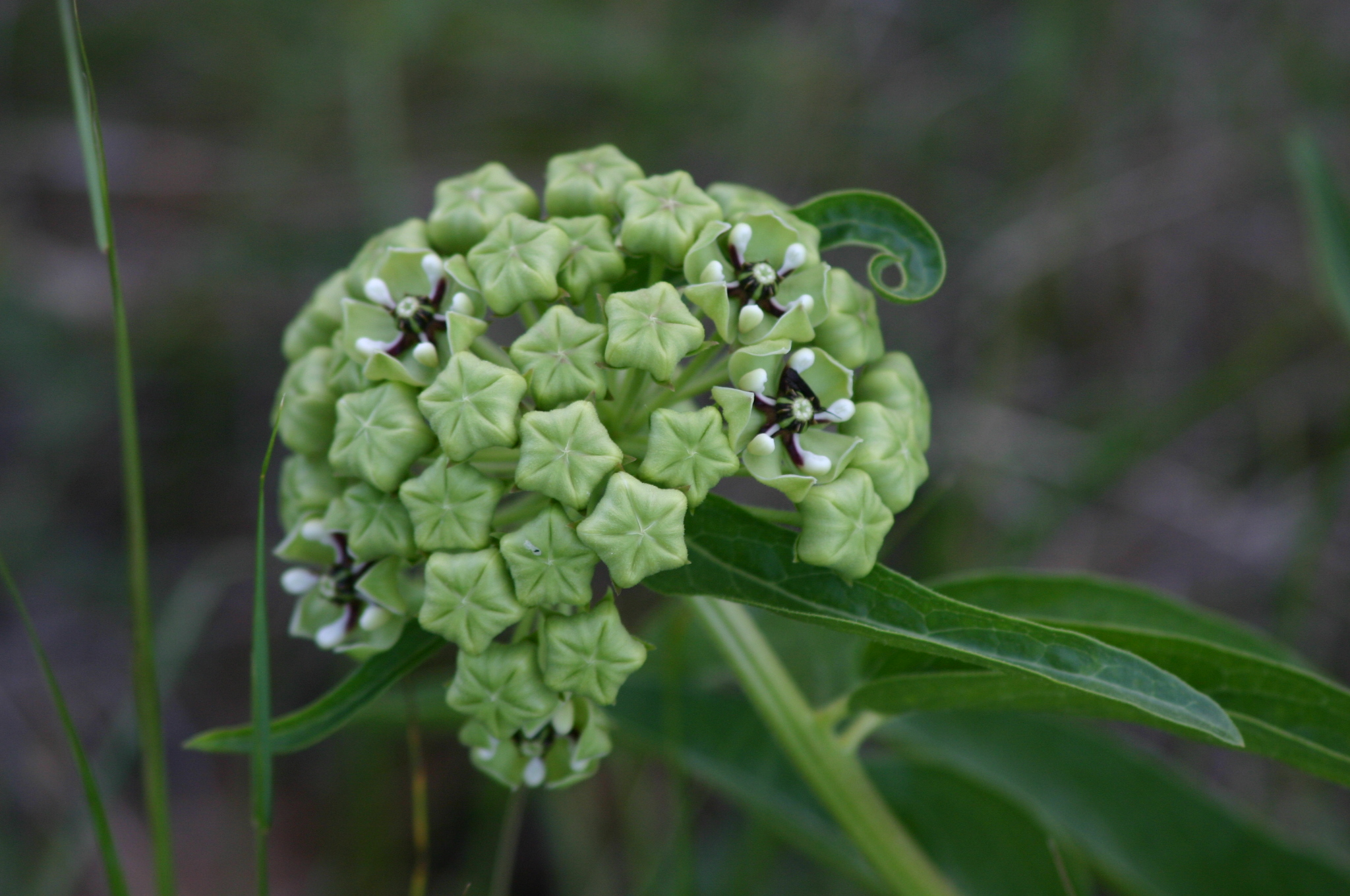
Asclepias asperula
Antelope horns, taken along Gorman Creek Trail

=== Animals ===
There are over 150 species of birds that live in the park, including the endangered golden-cheeked warbler. The endemic, near-threatened Guadalupe bass is among the fish that live in the river.

== See also ==
- List of Texas state parks
- Balcones Canyonlands National Wildlife Refuge
