= List of Texas state parks =

List of state parks in Texas

This is a list of state parks and state natural areas in Texas, United States, managed by the Texas Parks and Wildlife Department. Several state historic sites that used to be managed by Texas Parks and Wildlife are now managed by the Texas Historical Commission.

Texas State Parks (Hover mouse over pog to popup clickable link)

== State parks ==
Park Name	Image	County or Counties	Size	Year Established
Abilene State Park		Taylor	529.4-acre (214.2 ha)	1933
Albert and Bessie Kronkosky State Natural Area (slated for opening in December 1, 2026)		Bandera, Kendall	3814-acre (1543.5 ha)	2011
Atlanta State Park		Cass	1,475 acres (597 ha)	1954
Balmorhea State Park		Reeves	751 acres (304 ha)	1968
Barton Warnock Visitor Center		Brewster	99.9 acres	1990
Bastrop State Park		Bastrop	6,600 acres (2,700 ha)	1937
Bear Creek State Park (under development)		Uvalde	1,720 acres (700 ha)	2025
Bentsen-Rio Grande Valley State Park		Hidalgo	764 acres (309 ha)	1944
Big Bend Ranch State Park		Presidio, Brewster	311,000 acres (125,857 ha)	1988
Big Spring State Park		Howard	381.99 acres (154.59 ha)	1936
Blanco State Park		Blanco	104.6 acres (42.3 ha)	1934
Bonham State Park		Fannin	261 acres (106 ha)	1933
Brazos Bend State Park		Fort Bend	4,897 acres (1,982 ha)	1984
Buescher State Park		Bastrop	1,016.7 acres (411 ha)	1940
Caddo Lake State Park		Harrison	468 acres (189 ha)	1933
Caprock Canyons State Park and Trailway		Briscoe	15,314 acres (6,197 ha)	1982
Cedar Hill State Park - includes Penn Farm Agricultural History Center		Dallas	1,826 acres (739 ha)	1982
Chinati Mountains State Natural Area (under development)		Presidio	39,000 acres (15,783 ha)	1996
Choke Canyon State Park - includes Calliham Unit and South Shore Unit		Live Oak, McMullen	25,670 acres (10,390 ha)	1987
Cleburne State Park		Johnson	528 acres (214 ha)	1938
Colorado Bend State Park		Lampasas, San Saba	5,328.3 acres (2,156 ha)	1987
Cooper State Park - includes Doctors Creek Unit and South Sulphur Unit		Cooper	3,026 acres (1,225 ha)	1992
Copper Breaks State Park		Hardeman	1,898.8 acres (768 ha)	1974
Daingerfield State Park		Morris	507 acres (205 ha)	1938
Davis Hill State Natural Area (under development)		Liberty	1700 acres (688 ha)	1983
Davis Mountains State Park		Davis	2,709 acres (1,096 ha)	1938
Devils River State Natural Area - includes Dan Allen Hughes Unit and Del Norte Unit		Val Verde	37,000 acres (15,000 ha)	1988
Devil's Sinkhole State Natural Area		Edwards	3,059.7 acres (1,238.2 ha)	1985
Dinosaur Valley State Park		Somervell	1,524.72 acres (617.03 ha)	1972
Eisenhower State Park		Grayson	463.1 acres (187.4 ha)	1954
Enchanted Rock State Natural Area		Llano	5,388 acres (2,180 ha)	1978
Estero Llano Grande State Park		Hidalgo	230 acres (93 ha)	2006
Falcon State Park		Starr	576 acres (233 ha)	1965
Fort Boggy State Park		Leon	1,847 acres (747 ha)	1985
Fort Leaton State Historic Site		Presidio	23.4 acres (9.5 ha)	1973
Fort Parker State Park		Limestone	1,458.8 acres (590.4 ha)	1941
Fort Richardson State Park, Historic Site, and Lost Creek Reservoir State Trailway		Jack	454.16 acres (183.79 ha)	1968
Franklin Mountains State Park		El Paso	24,247 acres (9,812 ha)	1987
Galveston Island State Park		Galveston	2,013.1 acres (814.7 ha)	1975
Garner State Park		Uvalde	1,420 acres (570 ha)	1941
Goliad State Park and Historic Site - includes Mission Rosario State Historic Site and Zaragoza Birthplace State Historic Site		Goliad	188.3 acres (76 ha)	1936
Goose Island State Park		Aransas	321.4 acres (130 ha)	1935
Government Canyon State Natural Area		Bexar	12,085 acres (4,891 ha)	1993
Guadalupe River State Park		Comal, Kendall	1,938.7 acres (785 ha)	1983
Hill Country State Natural Area		Bandera, Medina	5,369 acres (2,173 ha)	1984
Honey Creek State Natural Area		Comal	2,293.7 acres (928.2 ha)	1985
Hueco Tanks State Park and Historic Site		El Paso	860 acres (350 ha)	1970
Huntsville State Park		Walker	2,083.2-acre (843 ha)	1956
Inks Lake State Park		Burnet	1,201 acres (486 ha)	1950
Kickapoo Cavern State Park		Kinney, Edwards	6,368.4 acres (2,577.2 ha)	1991
Lake Arrowhead State Park		Clay	524 acres (212 ha)	1970
Lake Bob Sandlin State Park		Titus, Camp, Franklin	641 acres (259 ha)	1987
Lake Brownwood State Park		Brown	537.5 acres (218 ha)	1938
Lake Casa Blanca International State Park		Webb	525 acres (212 ha)	1991
Lake Colorado City State Park		Mitchell	500 acres (200 ha)	1972
Lake Corpus Christi State Park		San Patricio	356 acres (144 ha)	1934
Lake Livingston State Park		Polk	635 acres (257 ha)	1977
Lake Mineral Wells State Park & Trailway		Parker	3,282.5 acres (1,328.4 ha)	1981
Lake Somerville State Park and Trailway - includes Birch Creek Unit and Nails Creek Unit		Burleson, Lee	5,520 acres (2,233.9 ha)	1970
Lake Tawakoni State Park		Hunt	376 acres (14,900 ha)	1984
Lake Whitney State Park		Hill	1,280.7 acres (518.3 ha)	1965
Lockhart State Park		Caldwell	453 acres (183 ha)	1948
Longhorn Cavern State Park		Burnet	645.62 acres (261 ha)	1976
Lost Maples State Natural Area		Bandera, Real	2,906 acres (1,176 ha)	1979
Lyndon B. Johnson State Park and Historic Site - includes Sauer-Beckmann Living History Farm		Gillespie	732.75 acres (297 ha)	1965
Martin Creek Lake State Park		Rusk	286.9 acres (116.1 ha)	1976
Martin Dies, Jr. State Park		Jasper, Tyler	730 acres (300 ha)	1965
McKinney Falls State Park		Travis	744.4 acres (301 ha)	1976
Meridian State Park		Bosque	505.4 acres (204.5 ha)	1935
Mission Tejas State Park		Houston	660 acres (270 ha)	1957
Monahans Sandhills State Park		Ward, Winkler	3,840 acres (1,550 ha)	1957
Mother Neff State Park		Coryell	259 acres (105 ha)	1937
Mustang Island State Park		Nueces	3,954 acres (1,600 ha)	1979
Old Tunnel State Park		Kendall	16.1 acres (6.5 ha)	1991
Palmetto State Park		Gonzales	270.3 acres (109 ha)	1936
Palo Duro Canyon State Park		Randall	28,000 acres (11,331 ha)	1934
Palo Pinto Mountains State Park		Palo Pinto, Stephens	4,871 acres (1,971 ha)	2011
Pedernales Falls State Park		Blanco	5,211.7 acres (2,109 ha)	1971
Possum Kingdom State Park		Palo Pinto	1,528.7 acres (618.6 ha)	1940
Post Oak Ridge State Park		Burnet, Lampasas	3,170 acres (1,280 ha)	2025
Powderhorn State Park (under development)		Calhoun	2,253 acres (912 ha)	2021
Purtis Creek State Park		Henderson, Van Zandt	1,582.4 acres (640.4 ha)	1988
Ray Roberts Lake State Park - includes Isle du Bois Unit, Johnson Branch Unit, Jordan Park Unit, Ray Roberts Greenbelt Corridor, and Sanger Marina Unit		Denton, Cooke, Grayson	29,350 acres (11,880 ha)	1993
Resaca de la Palma State Park		Cameron	1,200 acres (490 ha)	2008
San Angelo State Park		Tom Green	7,677 acres (3,107 ha)	1995
Sea Rim State Park		Jefferson	4,141 acres (1,676 ha)	1977
Seminole Canyon State Park and Historic Site		Val Verde	2,172.5 acres (879.2 ha)	1980
Sheldon Lake State Park and Environmental Learning Center		Harris	1,200 acres (1133 ha)	1984
Silver Lake State Park (under development)		Edward and Kinney	54,000 acres (21,853 ha)	2026
South Llano River State Park		Kimble	2,600 acres (1052 ha)	1990
Stephen F. Austin State Park		Austin	663.3 acres (268 ha)	1940
Tyler State Park		Smith	985.5 acres (399 ha)	1939
Village Creek State Park		Hardin	1,090 acres (441 ha)	1994

== See also ==
- Texas Parks and Wildlife Department
- List of Texas state historic sites
- List of U.S. national parks
- List of former Texas state parks
