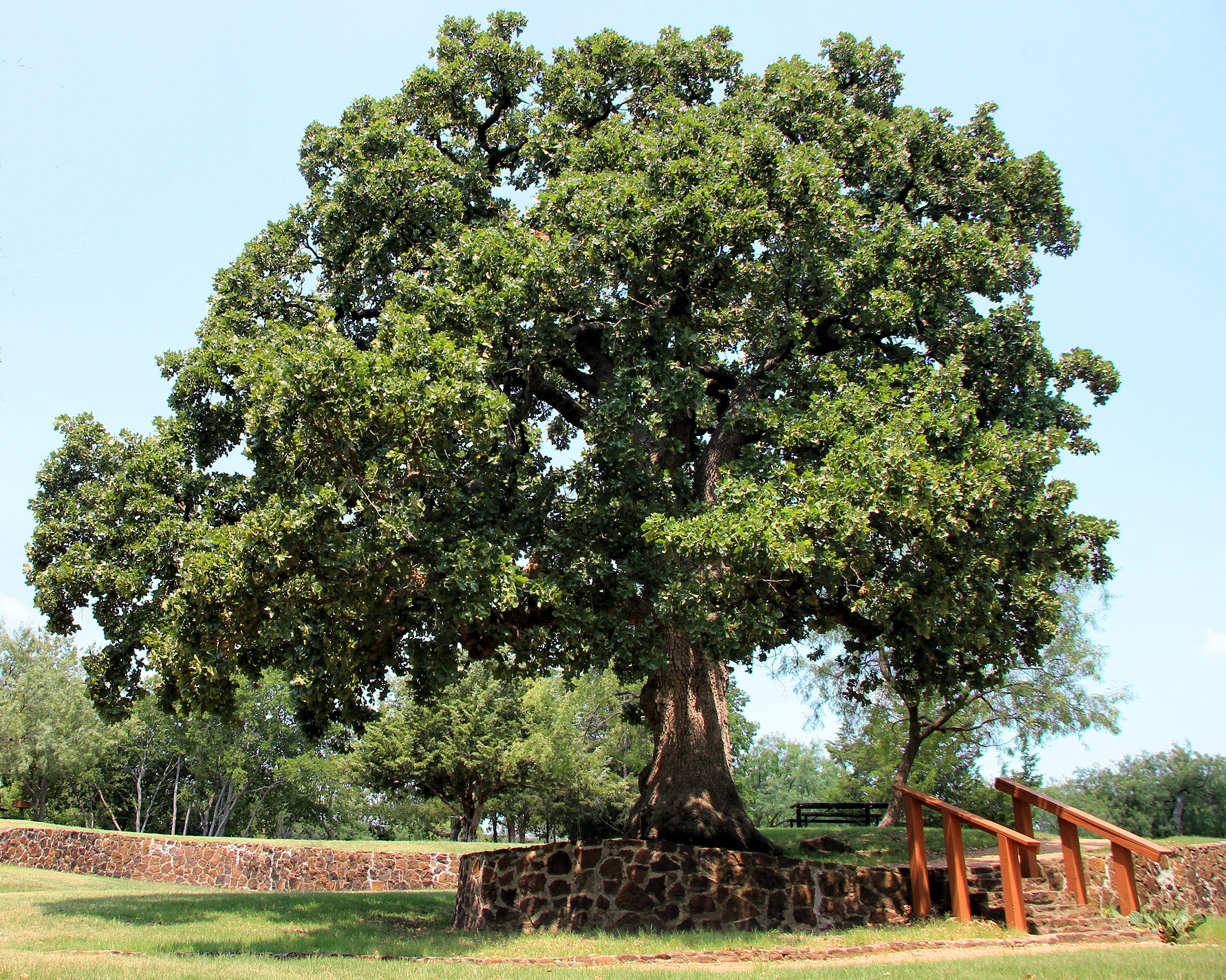
- The Houston Campsite oak in Grapevine Springs Preserve, Coppell, Texas

Conservation status
- Least Concern (IUCN 3.1)

Scientific classification
- Kingdom: Plantae
- Clade: Tracheophytes
- Clade: Angiosperms
- Clade: Eudicots
- Clade: Rosids
- Order: Fagales
- Family: Fagaceae
- Genus: Quercus
- Subgenus: Quercus subg. Quercus
- Section: Quercus sect. Quercus
- Species: Q. stellata

Binomial name
- Quercus stellata Wangenh.
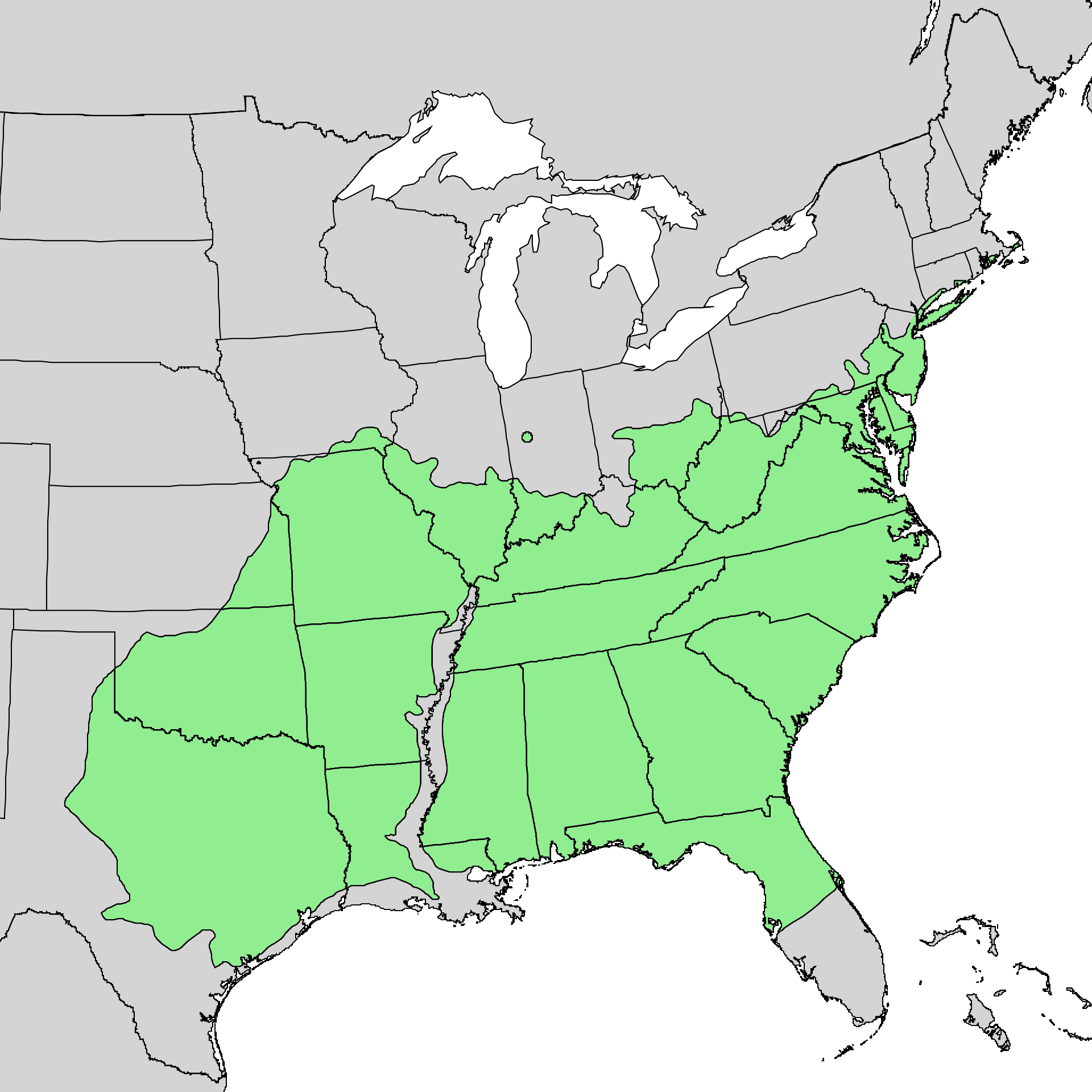
- Natural range of Quercus stellata

Synonyms
- List: Quercus alba var. minor Marshall; Quercus floridana Shuttlew. ex A.DC.; Quercus fusca Raf.; Quercus gonoloba Raf.; Quercus heteroloba Raf.; Quercus lobulata Sol. ex Sm.; Quercus minor (Marshall) Sarg.; Quercus obtusiloba Michx.; Quercus stellata var. anomala Sarg.; Quercus stellata f. cruciformis Trel.; Quercus stellata var. floridana A.DC.; Quercus stellata f. heterophylla Ettingsh. & Krašan; Quercus stellata f. houbae Trel.; Quercus stellata f. laevis Trel.; Quercus stellata f. mollissima Trel.; Quercus stellata f. oblonga Trel.; Quercus stellata subsp. obtusiloba (Michx.) Engelm.; Quercus stellata var. palmeri Sarg.; Quercus stellata var. parviloba Sarg.; Quercus stellata f. quadrata Trel.; Quercus stellata f. reducta Trel.; Quercus stellata var. rufescens Sarg.; Quercus stellata f. rufescens (Sarg.) Trel.; Quercus stellata f. sterrettii Trel.; Quercus stellata f. tonsa Trel.; Quercus villosa Walter

= Quercus stellata =

Post oak

Species of oak tree

Quercus stellata, the post oak or iron oak, is a North American species of oak in the white oak section. It is a slow-growing oak that lives in dry areas on the edges of fields, tops of ridges, and also grows in poor soils, and is resistant to rot, fire, and drought. Interbreeding occurs among white oaks, thus many hybrid species combinations occur. It is identifiable by the rounded cross-like shape formed by the leaf lobes and hairy underside of the leaves.

== Taxonomy ==
The specific epithet stellata is Latin for "star"; it is named this because the trichome hairs on the bottom of the leaves are stellate or star-shaped. Several variants of Q. stellata were named by American botanist Charles Sprague Sargent. The variety most recognised by the United States Forest Service is Q. stellata var. paludosa Sarg (delta post oak).

=== Hybrids ===
Hybrids
Hybrid Name	Q. stellata x <sp.>
Q. × stelloides E. J. Palmer	Q . prinoides
Q. × mahloni E. J. Palmer	Q . sinuata var. breviloba
Q. × pseudomargaretta Trelease	Q . margaretta
Q. × sterretti Trelease	Q . lyrata
Q. × macnabiana Sudworth	Q . sinuata
Q. × guadalupensis Sargent	Q . macrocarpa
Q . × fernowi Trelease	Q . alba
Q. × bernardensis W. Wolf	Q . montana

== Description ==
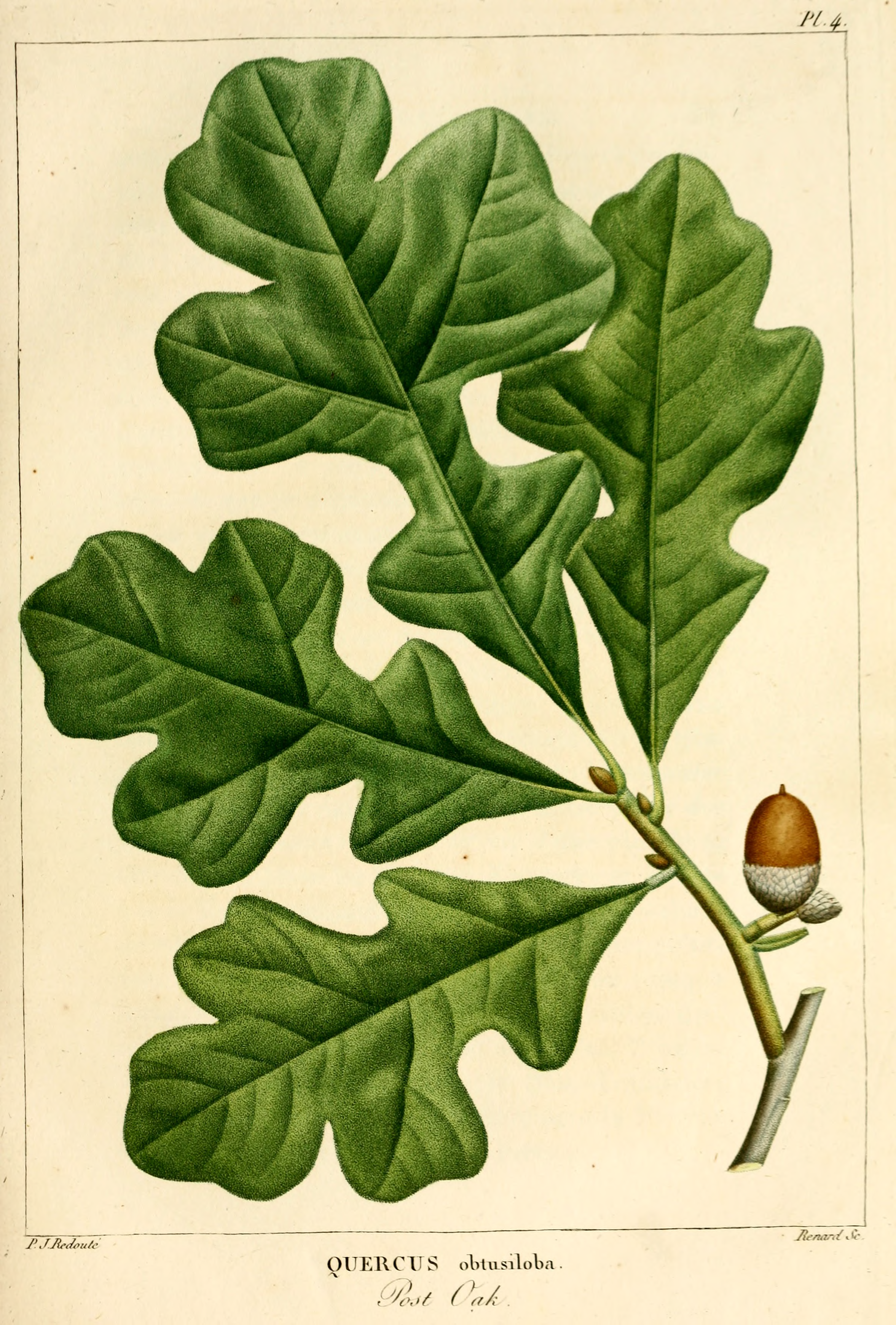
1812 illustration

Post oak is a relatively small tree, typically 10–15 metres (33–49 feet) tall and trunk 30–60 centimetres (12–24 inches) in diameter, though occasional specimens reach 30 m (98 ft) tall and 140 cm (55 in) in diameter. The leaves have a very distinctive shape, with three perpendicular terminal lobes, shaped much like a Maltese cross. They are leathery, and tomentose (densely short-hairy) beneath. The branching pattern of this tree often gives it a rugged appearance. The acorns are 1.5–2 cm (5/8–3/4 in) long, and are mature in their first summer.

=== Similar species ===
Both Quercus stellata and Q. alba are in a section of Quercus called the white oaks. In the white oak section, Q. stellata is a sister taxon with Q. alba. Q. stellata is sold and distributed as white oak. One identifiable difference between the two trees is that Q. stellata is 'hairy' on the underside of the leaf.

== Distribution and habitat ==
Q. stellata is found in the eastern and Midwestern United States both inland and along the coast, then in a narrow range along the eastern coast from Massachusetts to Florida, then westward to Texas, and inland to Iowa. Normally found at the edge of a forest, it typically grows in dry, sandy areas, deficient of nutrients.

== Ecology ==
Q. stellata has the ability to survive fires by having thicker bark. It is useful for fire surveys where the tree rings are used to get a fire history of an area. A tree ring survey of 36 trees in Illinois provided a 226-year tree ring record that indicated that many Q. stellata persisted through annual fire return intervals of 1.44 fires/year for over 100 years.

It is used for food for deer, turkeys, squirrels, and other rodents, but because the nuts contain tannin, it is toxic to cattle. A recent study in Kansas concluded that deer browsing reduces post-oak recruitment in canopy gaps generally in the sapling phase.

== Uses ==
Because of its ability to grow in dry sites, attractive crown, and strong horizontal branches, it is used in urban forestry. It is resistant to decay, so it is used for railroad ties, siding, planks, construction timbers, stair risers and treads, flooring, pulp, veneer, particle board, fuel, and its namesake fence posts. It is one of the most common types of wood used for Central Texas barbecue.
