= Texas Parks and Wildlife Department =

Texas state agency

Texas Parks and Wildlife Department Texas
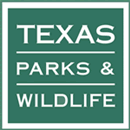

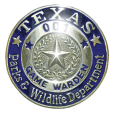
- Official Texas Game Warden Badge

- Flag of the State of Texas

Agency overview
- Formed: 1963; 63 years ago
- Preceding agencies: The State Parks Board; The Game and Fish Commission

Jurisdictional structure
- Operations jurisdiction: Texas, U.S.
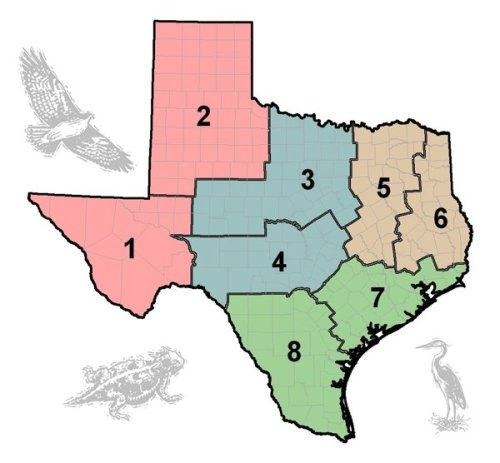
- Map of Texas Parks and Wildlife Department's jurisdiction
- Area: 268,820 square miles (696,240 km^{2})
- Population: 27,469,114 (2015 est.)
- General nature: Civilian police

Operational structure
- Headquarters: Austin, Texas, United States
- Game Wardens: 493
- Park Police Officers: 170
- Agency executive: Dr. David Yoskowitz, Executive Director

Website
- tpwd.texas.gov

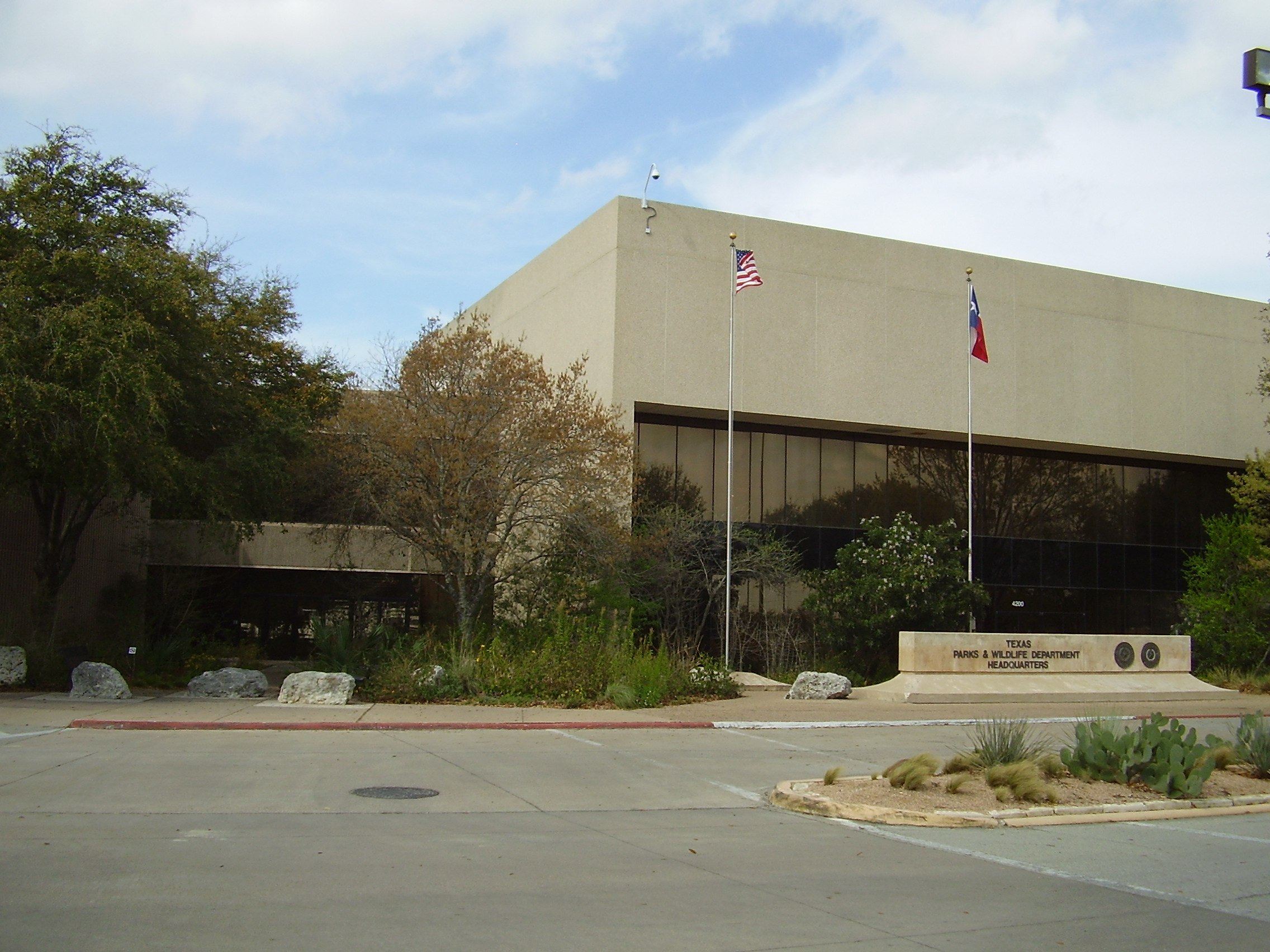
The headquarters of the department in Austin

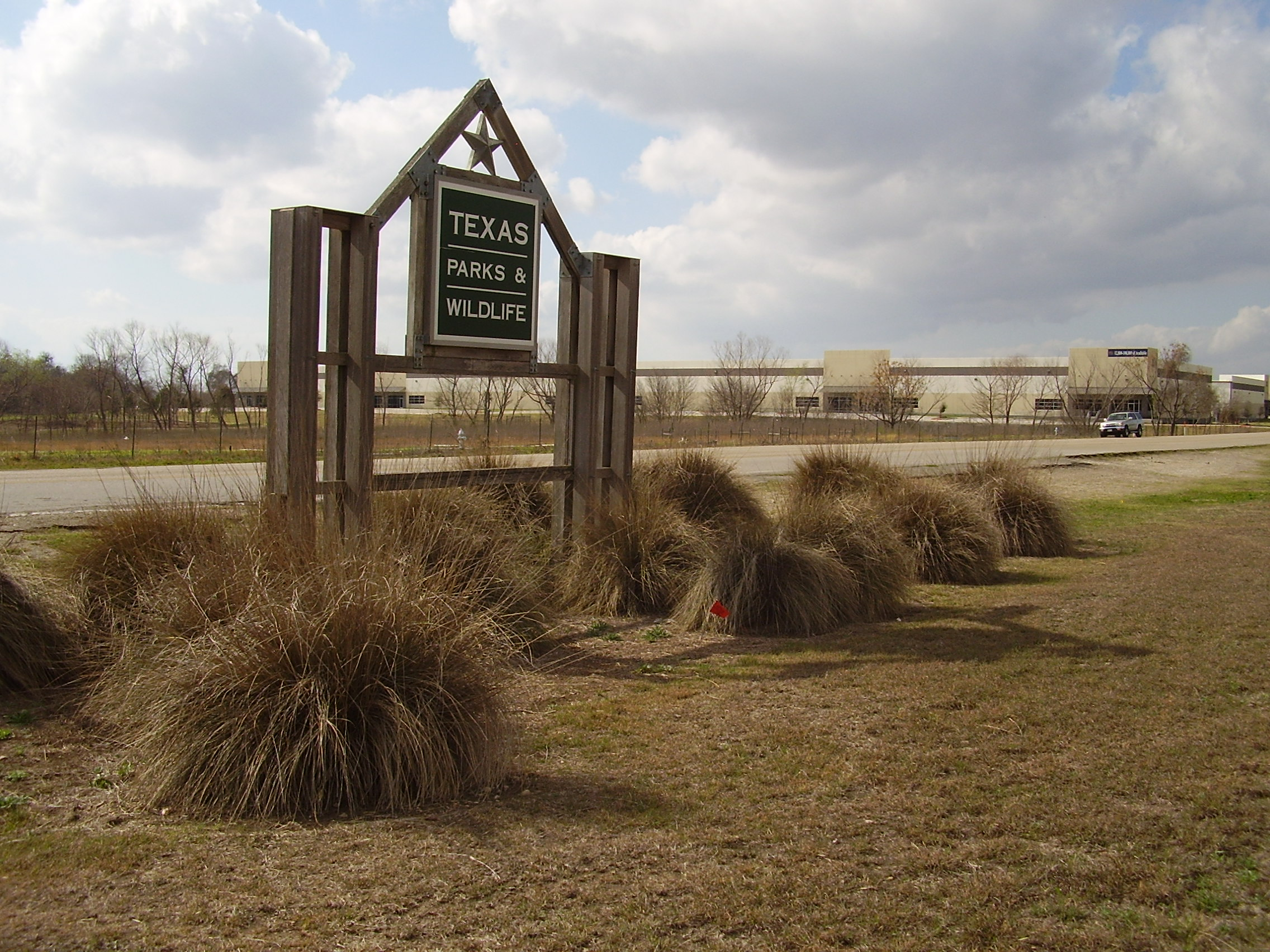
A sign indicating the direction of the headquarters

The Texas Parks & Wildlife Department (TPWD) is a Texas state agency that oversees and protects wildlife and their habitats. In addition, the agency is responsible for managing the state's parks and historical areas. Its mission is to manage and conserve the natural and cultural resources of Texas and to provide hunting, fishing, and outdoor recreation opportunities for the use and enjoyment of present and future generations.

The agency maintains its headquarters at 4200 Smith School Road in Austin, Texas.

== History ==
In 1895, the Texas Legislature created the Fish and Oyster Commission to regulate fishing. The legislature added the Game Department to the commission in 1907. The Legislature created the State Parks Board as a separate entity in 1923. In 1963, the Texas Parks and Wildlife Department was formed through merger of the State Parks Board and the Game and Fish Commission.

In 1983, the Texas legislature passed the Wildlife Conservation Act, giving the department the authority for managing fish and wildlife resources in all Texas counties. The department operates 95 state parks and historic sites, 51 wildlife management areas, eight fish hatcheries, and numerous field offices statewide. On January 1, 2008, and September 1, 2019, TPWD transferred management of several historic sites to the Texas Historical Commission.

== Budget and staff ==
The agency employs more than 3,500 permanent employees, and 300 interns every summer, from every field of study. Intern programs vary but are typically 12 weeks long and go from May until August.

Game wardens and park police officers undergo a 30-week course at TPWD's Texas Game Warden Training Center in rural Hamilton County.

== Organization ==
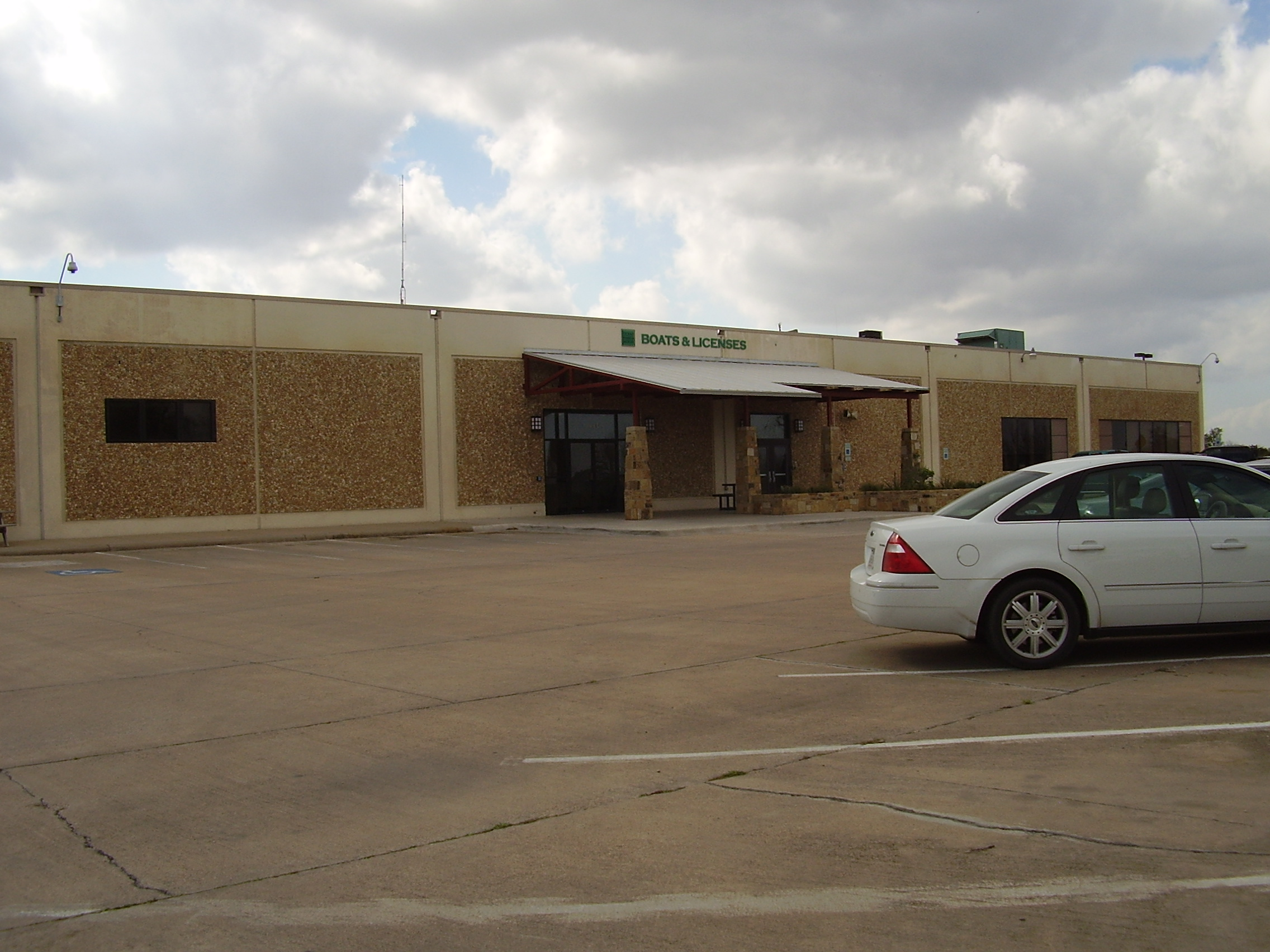
Boats & Licenses Building in Austin

The department is made up of 13 divisions:

- Coastal Fisheries
- Communications
- Financial Resources
- Human Resources
- Information Technology
- Infrastructure
- Inland Fisheries
- Law Enforcement - Game wardens primarily enforce the provisions of the TPW Code but are fully empowered peace officers with statewide jurisdiction and may make arrests for any offense.
- Legal
- State Parks - includes Park Police Officers
- Support Resources
- Executive
- Wildlife

== Outreach ==
=== Magazine ===
TPWD publishes Texas Parks and Wildlife, a monthly magazine available both in print and online editions. The magazine features articles and full-color photos on topics such as birding, boating, camping, fishing, hunting, state parks, travel, wildlife, and environmental issues. Texas Parks and Wildlife has been in publication since 1942.

=== Television programs ===
Texas Parks & Wildlife is a weekly, half-hour television series aired on Texas PBS stations, as well as on a number of other PBS stations around the country. Viewers can stream episodes on the PBS website and on the TPWD YouTube channel. Originally titled Made in Texas, the series began production in 1985 as a magazine style show, with three or four different segments each week. For several years, the show focused on one topic each week, documentary style. In 1991, the name of the series changed to Texas Parks & Wildlife and reverted to its original magazine format.

Beginning in June 2016, TPWD Game Wardens were featured in a new reality television series on Animal Planet titled Lone Star Law.

=== Radio program and podcast ===
Passport to Texas is a daily series broadcast on radio stations throughout Texas. The series includes 90 second radio spots on topics, including wildlife, state parks, and outdoor activities.

Under the Texas Sky features outdoor experiences of both everyday people and experts from inside and outside TPWD.

== Texas Parks and Wildlife Foundation ==
Founded in 1991, the Texas Parks and Wildlife Foundation is the nonprofit funding partner of TPWD. Overseen by a board of trustees and administered by full- and part-time staff members, the foundation has raised over $205 million since its inception to ensure all Texans can enjoy, explore, and be inspired by the wild things and wild places in Texas.

== See also ==
- List of Texas state parks
- List of Texas Wildlife Management Areas
- List of state and territorial fish and wildlife management agencies in the United States
- Texas State Railroad
