= Smilia fasciata =

Scientific classification
- Domain: Eukaryota
- Kingdom: Animalia
- Phylum: Arthropoda
- Class: Insecta
- Order: Hemiptera
- Suborder: Auchenorrhyncha
- Family: Membracidae
- Genus: Smilia
- Species: S. fasciata

Binomial name
- Smilia fasciata Amyot and Serrville, 1843

Species of insects

Smilia fasciata is a species of treehopper belonging to the family Membracidae. It was first described by Charles Jean-Baptiste Amyot and Jean Guillaume Audinet-Serville in 1843.

== Habitat ==
It is commonly found across the eastern half of the United States. It feeds on most species of the Oak genus.

== Appearance ==
S. fasciata is similar in appearance to Smilia camelus, but has a lower pronotum and a white stripe instead of a greenish-yellow stripe. The size of the female is about 9 mm (0.35 in) and the size of the male is 7–8 mm (0.28–0.31 in).
