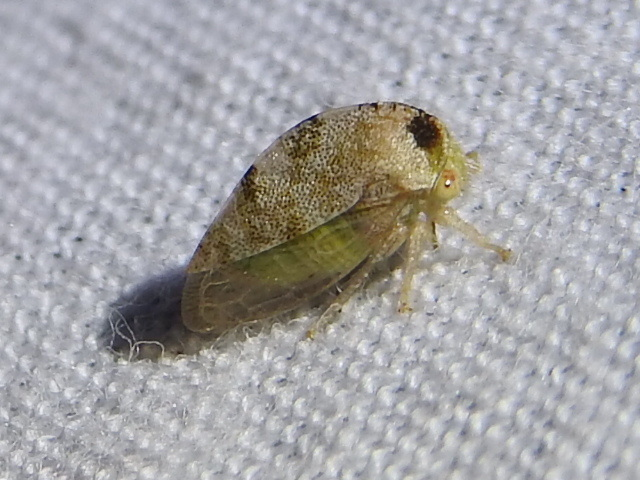

Scientific classification
- Domain: Eukaryota
- Kingdom: Animalia
- Phylum: Arthropoda
- Class: Insecta
- Order: Hemiptera
- Suborder: Auchenorrhyncha
- Family: Membracidae
- Genus: Cyrtolobus
- Species: C. maculifrontis

Binomial name
- Cyrtolobus maculifrontis Emmons, 1854

= Cyrtolobus maculifrontis =

Species of insect

Cyrtolobus maculifrontis is a species of treehopper belonging to the genus Cyrtolobus and the family Membracidae. It was first described by Ebenezer Emmons in 1854.

== Etymology ==
The Latin word "maculifrontis" means "with spotted forehead", which describes the characteristic black spots on their head.

== Distribution ==
C. maculifrontis is found in central and eastern United States and southern Canada.
