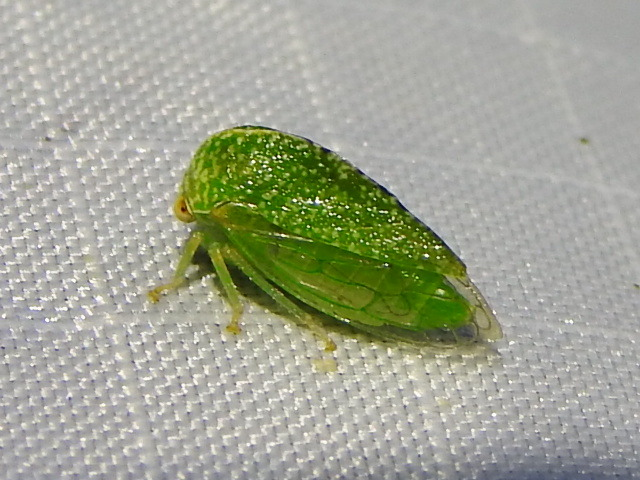

Scientific classification
- Kingdom: Animalia
- Phylum: Arthropoda
- Class: Insecta
- Order: Hemiptera
- Suborder: Auchenorrhyncha
- Family: Membracidae
- Genus: Cyrtolobus
- Species: C. dixianus

Binomial name
- Cyrtolobus dixianus Woodruff, 1924

= Cyrtolobus dixianus =

Species of treehopper

Cyrtolobus dixianus is a species of treehopper belonging to the genus Cyrtolobus. It was first described by L. B. Woodruff in 1924.

== Description ==
C. dixianus is one of the largest species of its genus, with adult males averaging about 6.5 mm (0.26 in) and females averaging about 7 mm (0.28 in). The pronotum of males are typically dark brown, riddled with yellow spots, while females are green. Their head has a yellowish-green hue if male, and more of a pale brown if female.

== Habitat ==
C. dixianus is found in the Midwest-Southeastern area of the United States. The adult is typically observed in April and May. It feeds on many types of oaks, including Quercus alba, Q. falcata, Q. palustris and Q. stellata.
