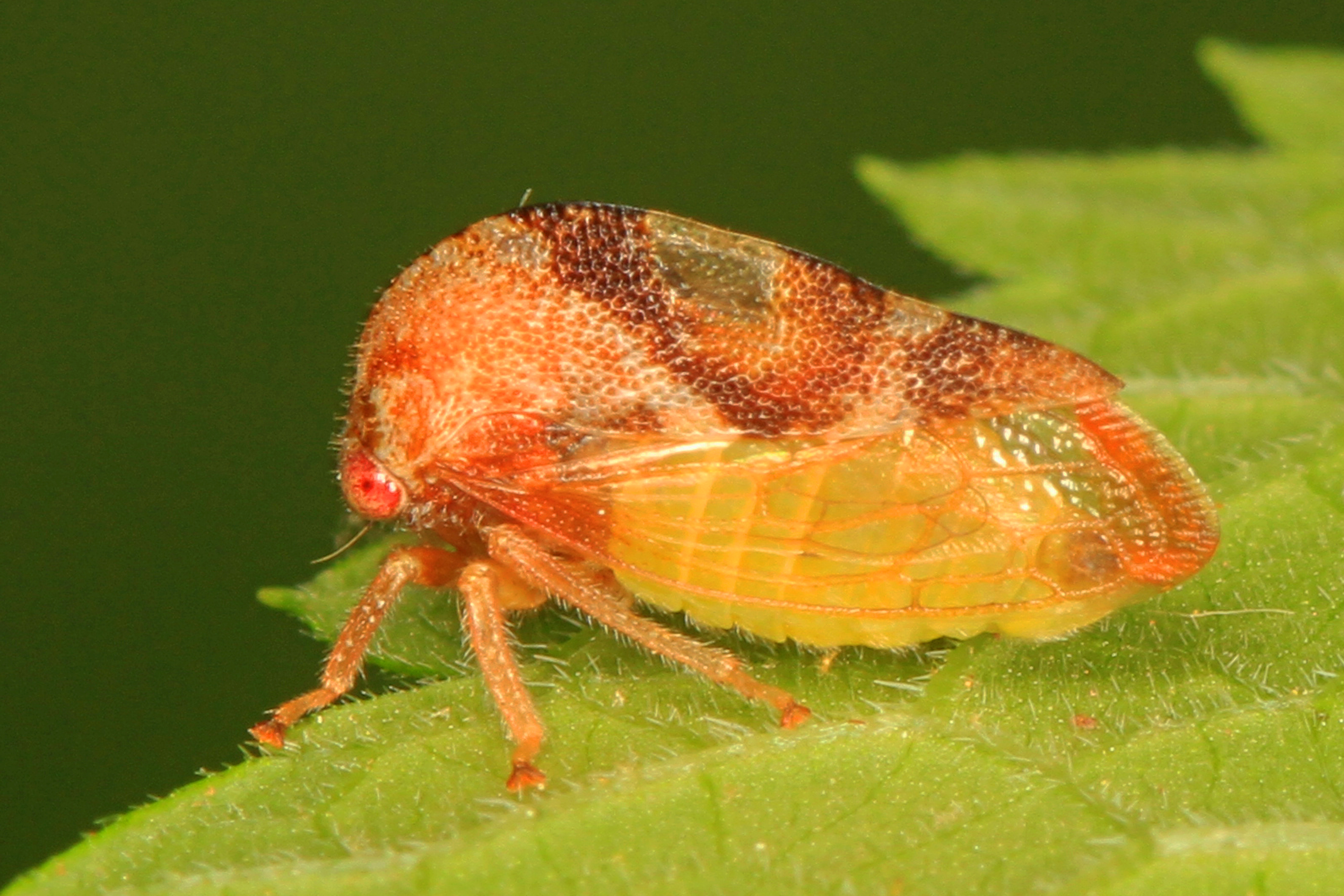

Scientific classification
- Domain: Eukaryota
- Kingdom: Animalia
- Phylum: Arthropoda
- Class: Insecta
- Order: Hemiptera
- Suborder: Auchenorrhyncha
- Family: Membracidae
- Genus: Cyrtolobus
- Species: C. vau

Binomial name
- Cyrtolobus vau Say, 1830

= Cyrtolobus vau =

Species of insect

Cyrtolobus vau is a species of treehopper belonging to the genus Cyrtolobus. It was first described by Thomas Say in 1830.

== Appearance ==
Cyrtolobus vau is a small species with adults being 5-6 millimetres. Males have a lower pronotal crest than females. Eye color ranges from grayish-brown to red.

== Habitat ==
Cyrtolobus vau is found across eastern United States. They feed on many types of oaks (Quercus), such as:

- Quercus alba
- Quercus prinus
- Quercus stellata
