= Ophiderma pubescens =

Scientific classification
- Domain: Eukaryota
- Kingdom: Animalia
- Phylum: Arthropoda
- Class: Insecta
- Order: Hemiptera
- Suborder: Auchenorrhyncha
- Family: Membracidae
- Genus: Ophiderma
- Species: O. pubescens

Binomial name
- Ophiderma pubescens Emmons, 1854

Species of treehoppers

Ophiderma pubescens is a species of treehopper belonging to the subfamily Smiliinae. It was first described by Ebenezer Emmons in 1854.

== Distribution ==
Ophiderma pubescens is found across eastern and central North America. It is commonly found from April to July.

== Diet ==
Ophiderma pubescens feeds on the trees of the genus Quercus, or oaks, including:

- Q. falcata (southern red oak)
- Q. marilandica (blackjack oak)
- Q. stellata (post oak)
- Q. rubra (northern red oak)
