= Cyrtolobus flavolatus =

Scientific classification
- Domain: Eukaryota
- Kingdom: Animalia
- Phylum: Arthropoda
- Class: Insecta
- Order: Hemiptera
- Suborder: Auchenorrhyncha
- Family: Membracidae
- Genus: Cyrtolobus
- Species: C. flavolatus

Binomial name
- Cyrtolobus flavolatus Woodruff

Species of insect

Cyrtolobus flavolatus is a species of treehopper belonging to the family Membracidae.
