= Cyrtolobus cinerea =

Scientific classification
- Kingdom: Animalia
- Phylum: Arthropoda
- Class: Insecta
- Order: Hemiptera
- Suborder: Auchenorrhyncha
- Family: Membracidae
- Genus: Cyrtolobus
- Species: C. cinerea

Binomial name
- Cyrtolobus cinerea Emmons, 1854

Species of insect

Cyrtolobus cinerea is a species of treehopper belonging to the family Membracidae. It is commonly found in the Midwest and eastern states of the US.
