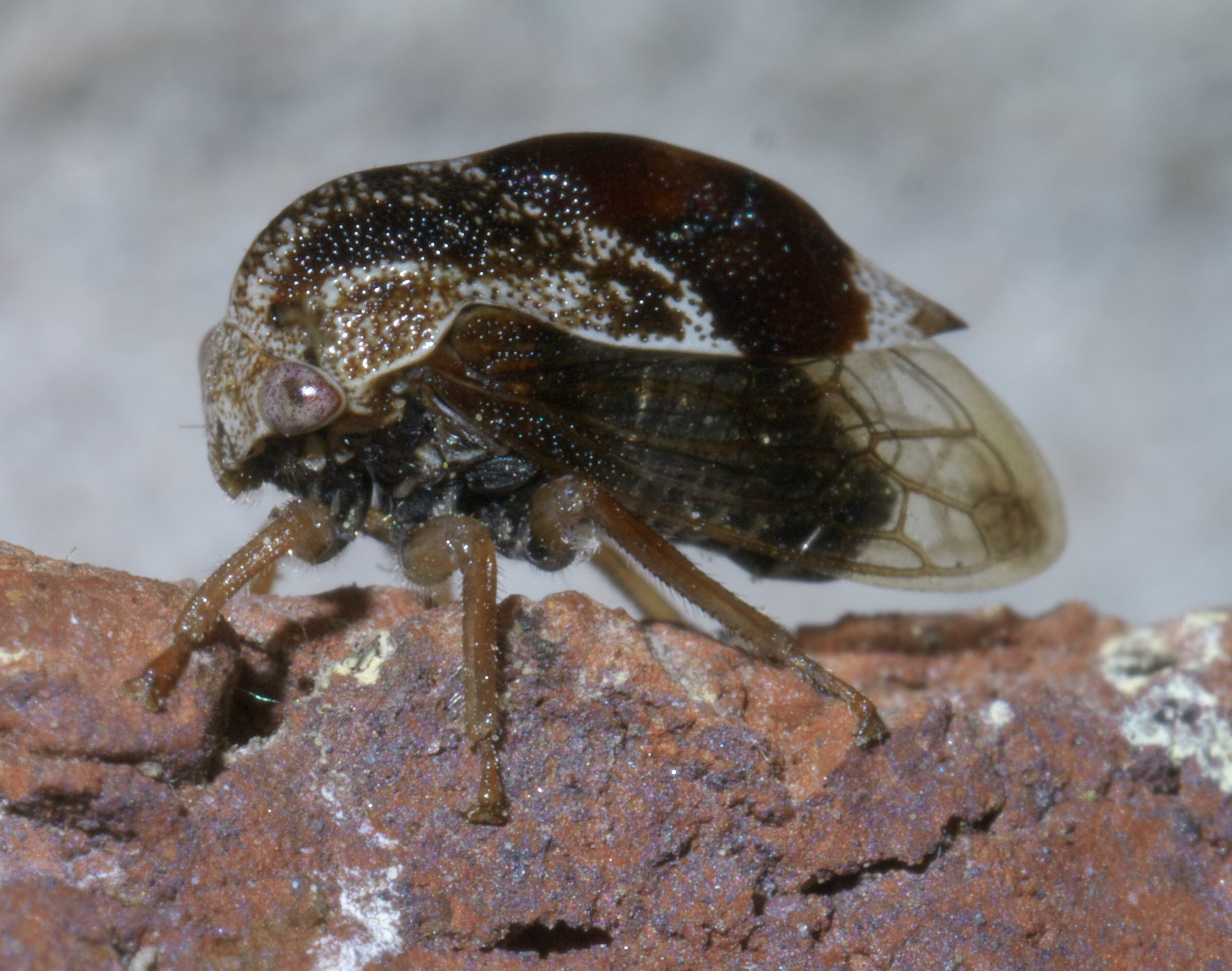

Scientific classification
- Kingdom: Animalia
- Phylum: Arthropoda
- Clade: Pancrustacea
- Class: Insecta
- Order: Hemiptera
- Suborder: Auchenorrhyncha
- Family: Membracidae
- Subfamily: Smiliinae
- Tribe: Smiliini
- Genus: Xantholobus; Van Duzee, 1908

= Xantholobus =

Genus of treehoppers

Xantholobus is a genus of treehoppers in the family Membracidae. There are about 14 described species in Xantholobus.

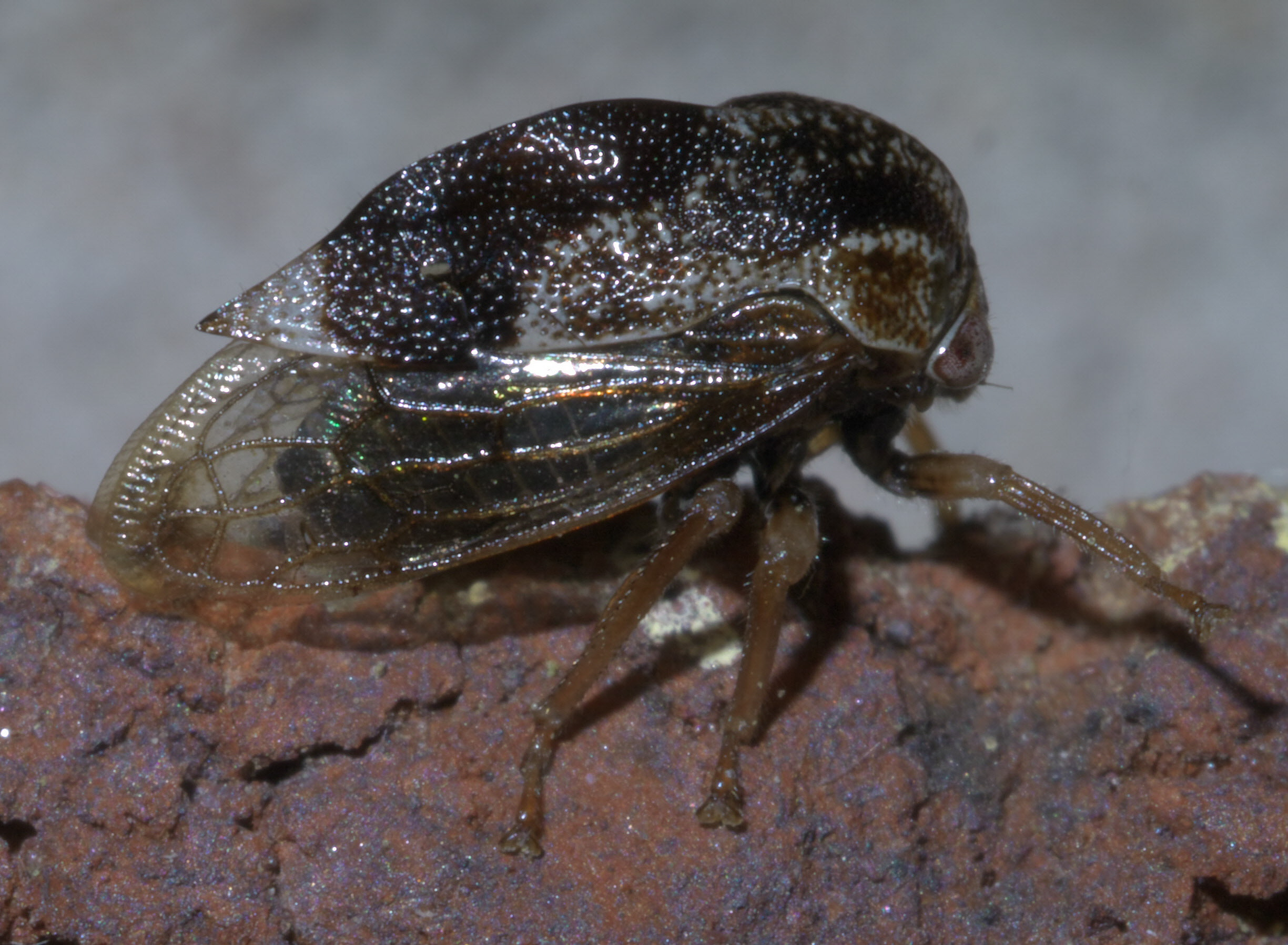

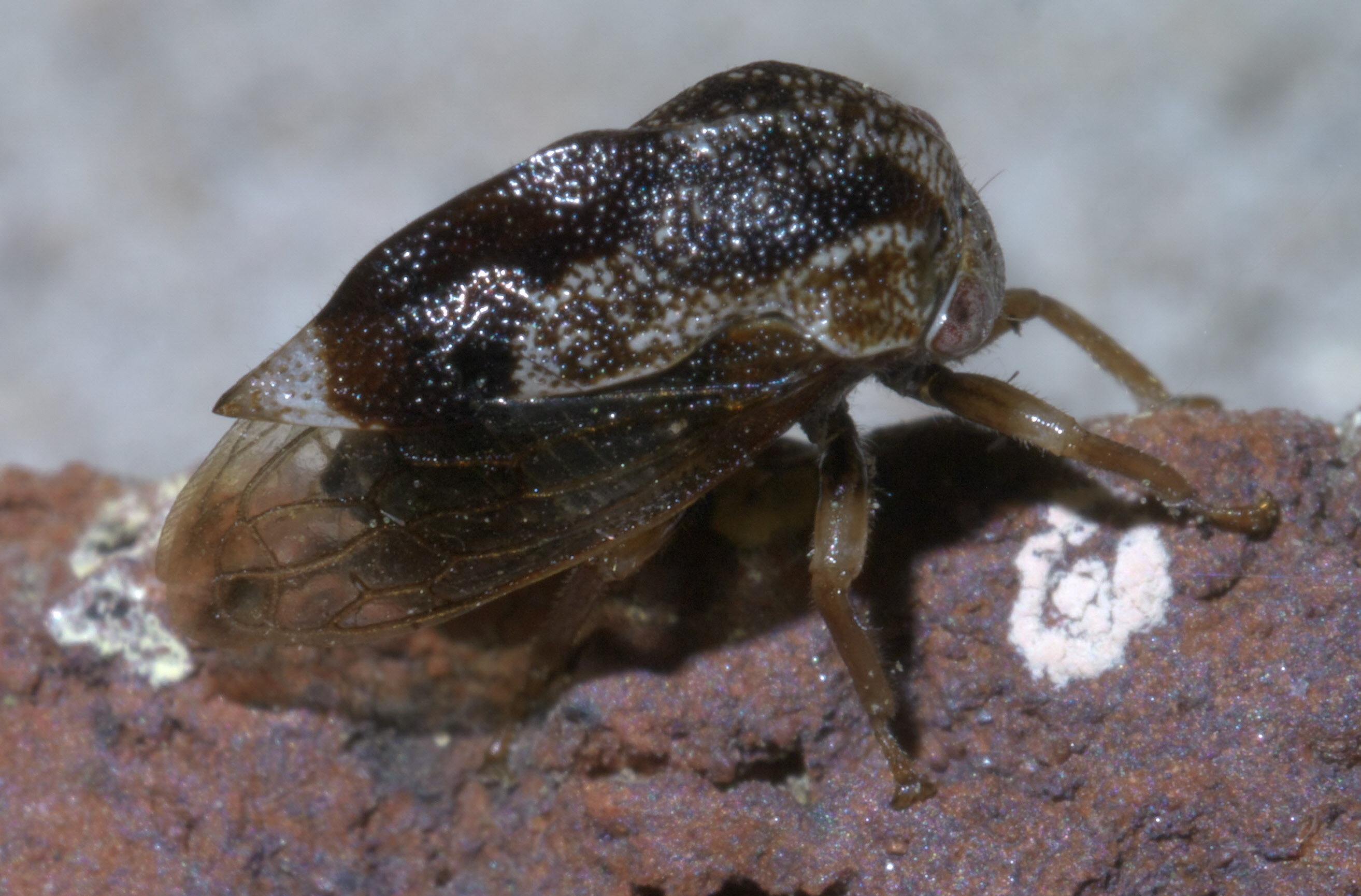

== Species ==
These 14 species belong to the genus Xantholobus:

- Xantholobus altus Ball^{c g}
- Xantholobus arenatus Ball^{c g}
- Xantholobus arizonensis Funkhouser^{c g}
- Xantholobus coconinus Ball^{c g}
- Xantholobus hirsutus Ball^{c g}
- Xantholobus inflatus Van Duzee^{c g}
- Xantholobus intermedia Emmons^{c g}
- Xantholobus intermedius^{b}
- Xantholobus lateralis Van Duzee^{c g b}
- Xantholobus mutica Fabricius^{c g}
- Xantholobus muticus^{b}
- Xantholobus nigrocincta Van Duzee^{c g}
- Xantholobus nitidus Van Duzee^{c g}
- Xantholobus tumida Walker^{c g}

Data sources: i = ITIS, c = Catalogue of Life, g = GBIF, b = Bugguide.net
