= Atymnina =

Scientific classification
- Domain: Eukaryota
- Kingdom: Animalia
- Phylum: Arthropoda
- Class: Insecta
- Order: Hemiptera
- Suborder: Auchenorrhyncha
- Family: Membracidae
- Subfamily: Smiliinae
- Tribe: Smiliini
- Genus: Atymnina; Plummer, 1938
- Species: A. elongata

Binomial name
- Atymnina elongata Plummer, 1938

Genus of insects

Atymnina is a genus of treehopper of the tribe Smiliini. It was discovered by Plummer in 1938. There is only one described species in this genus, Atymnina elongata.
