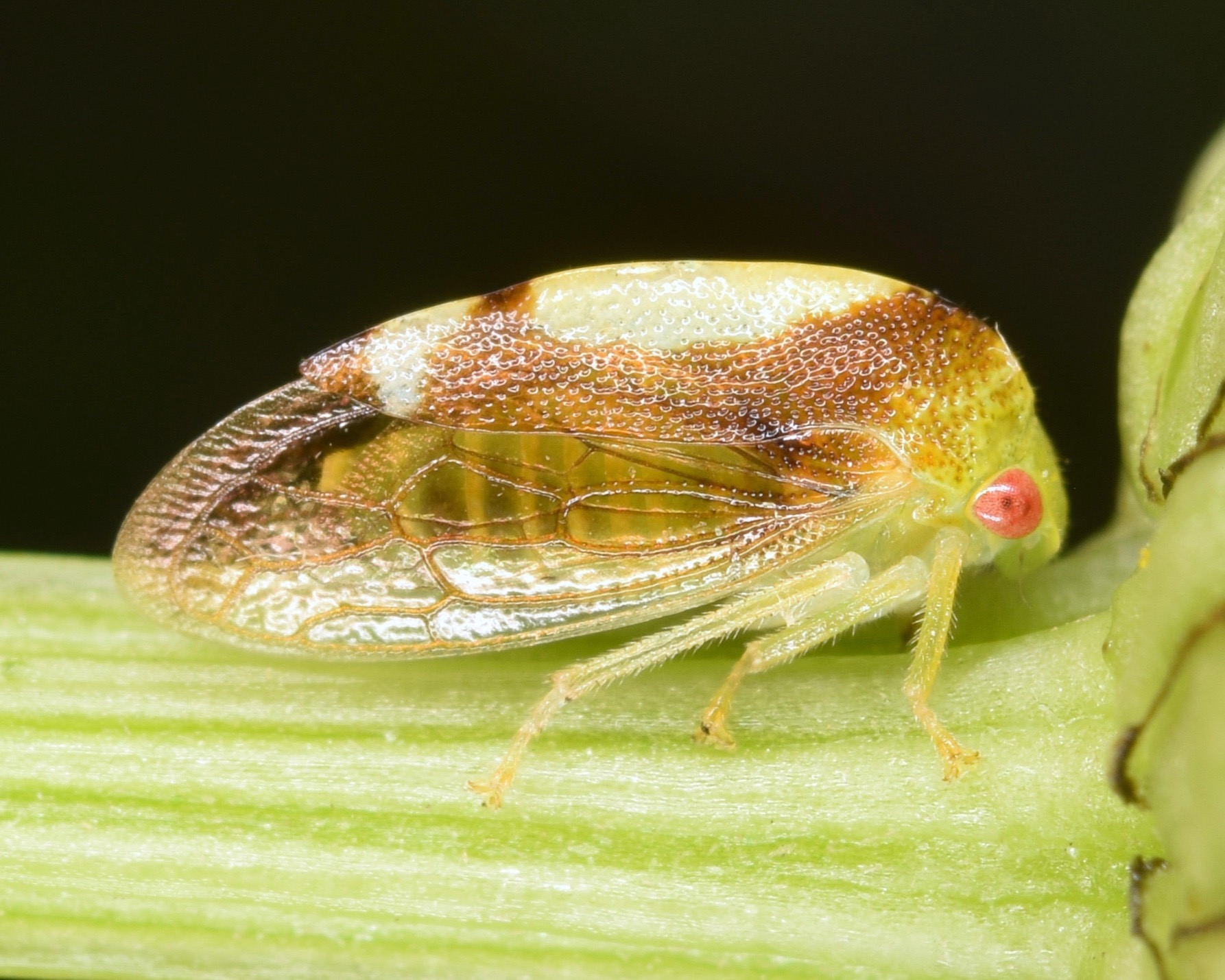
- Male atymna querci

Scientific classification
- Kingdom: Animalia
- Phylum: Arthropoda
- Class: Insecta
- Order: Hemiptera
- Suborder: Auchenorrhyncha
- Family: Membracidae
- Genus: Atymna
- Species: A. querci

Binomial name
- Atymna querci (Fitch, 1851)

= Atymna querci =

Species of insect

Atymna querci is a species of treehoppers in the family Membracidae.

== Gallery ==
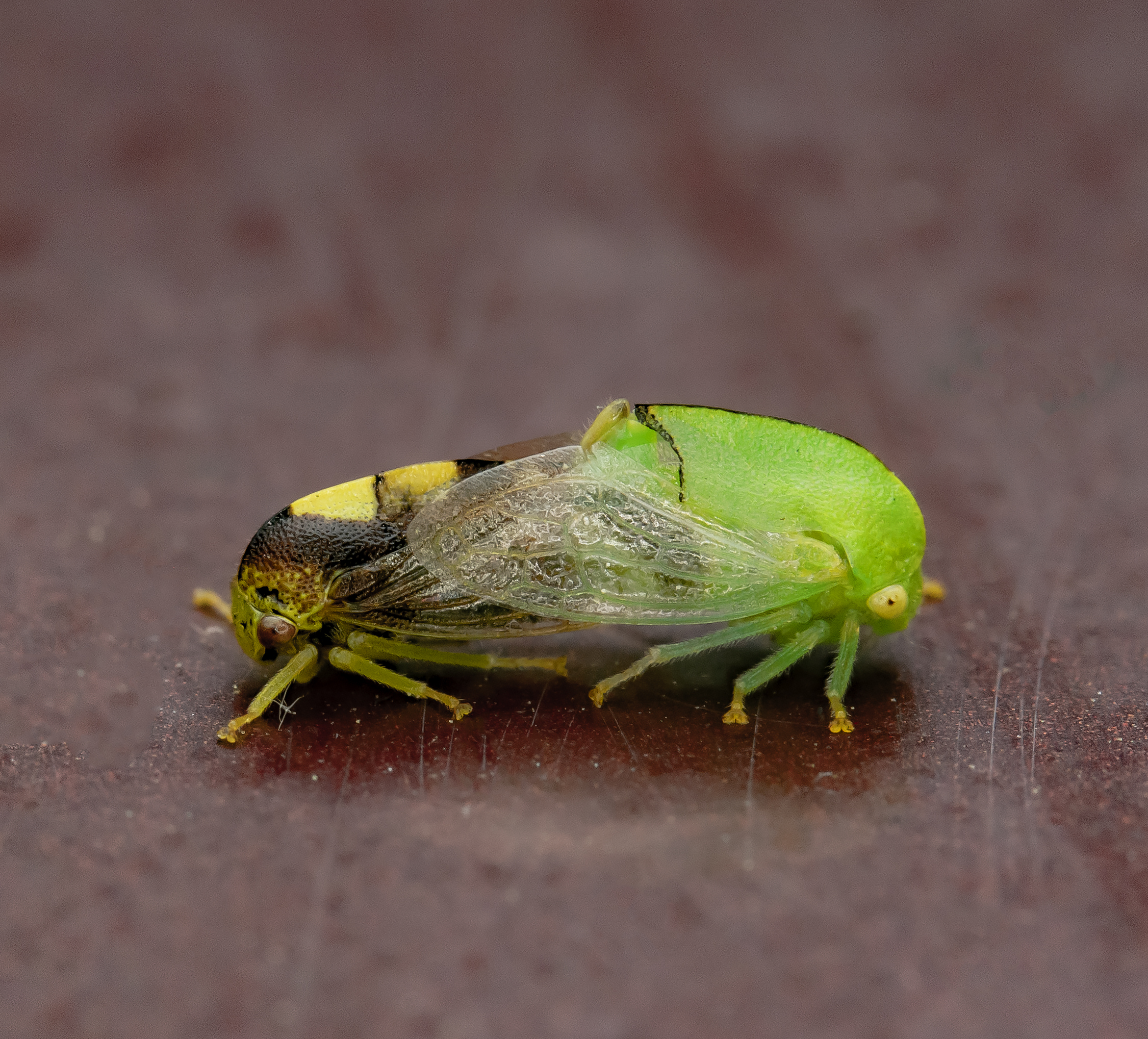
Male and female Atymna querci mating
