= Cyrtolobus frigidus =

Scientific classification
- Kingdom: Animalia
- Phylum: Arthropoda
- Class: Insecta
- Order: Hemiptera
- Suborder: Auchenorrhyncha
- Family: Membracidae
- Genus: Cyrtolobus
- Species: C. frigidus

Binomial name
- Cyrtolobus frigidus Ball, 1932

Species of treehopper

Cyrtolobus frigidus is a species of treehopper belonging to the family Membracidae. It is found in Utah and Arizona.
