= Cyrtolobus cinctus =

Scientific classification
- Kingdom: Animalia
- Phylum: Arthropoda
- Class: Insecta
- Order: Hemiptera
- Suborder: Auchenorrhyncha
- Family: Membracidae
- Genus: Cyrtolobus
- Species: C. cinctus

Binomial name
- Cyrtolobus cinctus Van Duzee, 1908

Species of insect

Cyrtolobus cinctus is a species of treehopper belonging to the family Membracidae. It was described in 1908.
