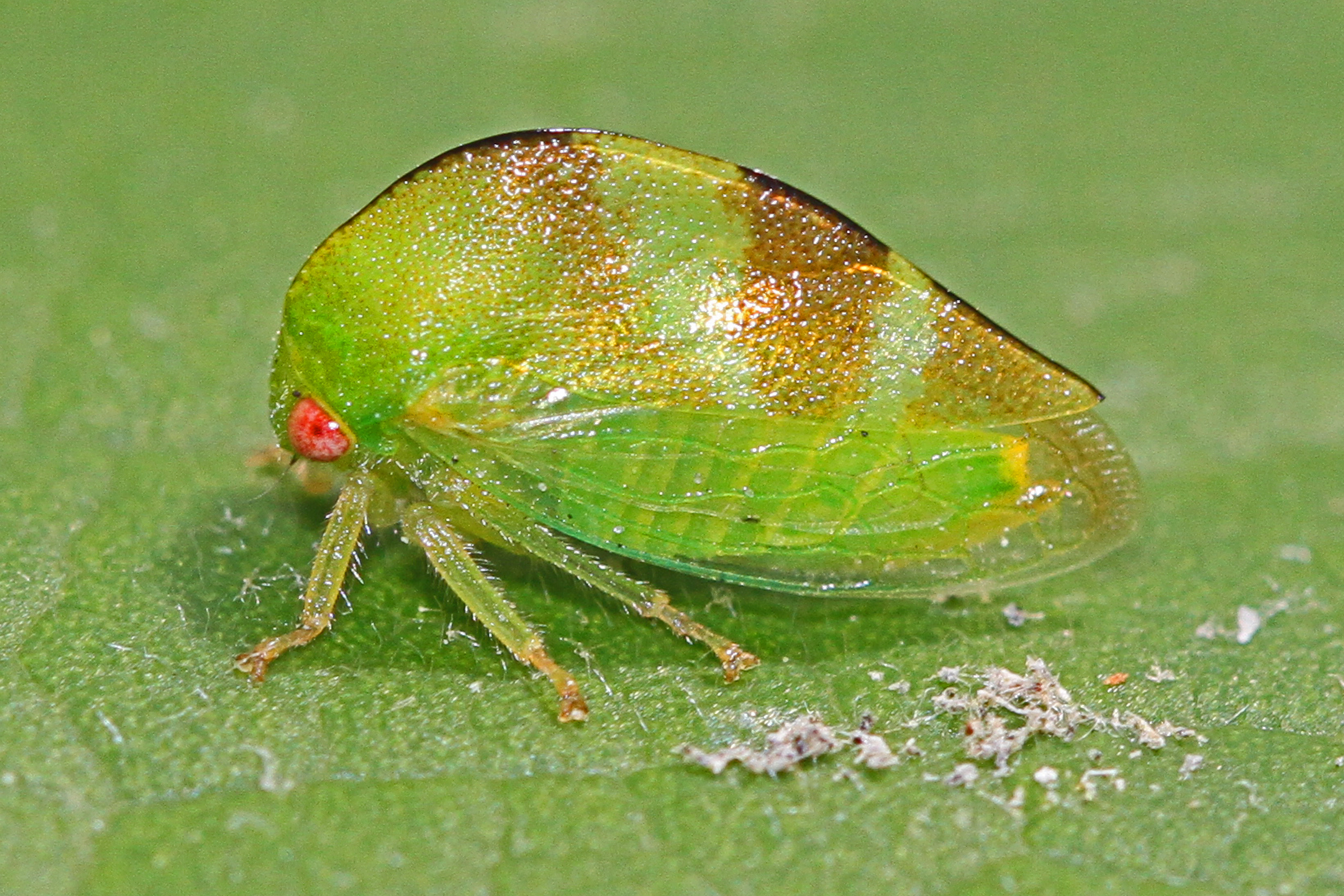

Scientific classification
- Domain: Eukaryota
- Kingdom: Animalia
- Phylum: Arthropoda
- Class: Insecta
- Order: Hemiptera
- Suborder: Auchenorrhyncha
- Family: Membracidae
- Genus: Cyrtolobus
- Species: C. auroreus

Binomial name
- Cyrtolobus auroreus Woodruff, 1924

= Cyrtolobus auroreus =

Species of insect

Cyrtolobus auroreus is a species of treehopper and was first described by L. B. Woodruff. It is found in eastern and midwestern United States.
