= Cyrtolobus fenestratus =

Scientific classification
- Kingdom: Animalia
- Phylum: Arthropoda
- Class: Insecta
- Order: Hemiptera
- Suborder: Auchenorrhyncha
- Family: Membracidae
- Genus: Cyrtolobus
- Species: C. fenestratus

Binomial name
- Cyrtolobus fenestratus Fitch

Species of insect

Cyrtolobus fenestratus is a species of treehopper belonging to the family Membracidae. It was first described by Dr. Asa Fitch in 1851.

== Distribution ==
C. fenestratus is found in eastern United States stretching to Colorado and southern Canada.
