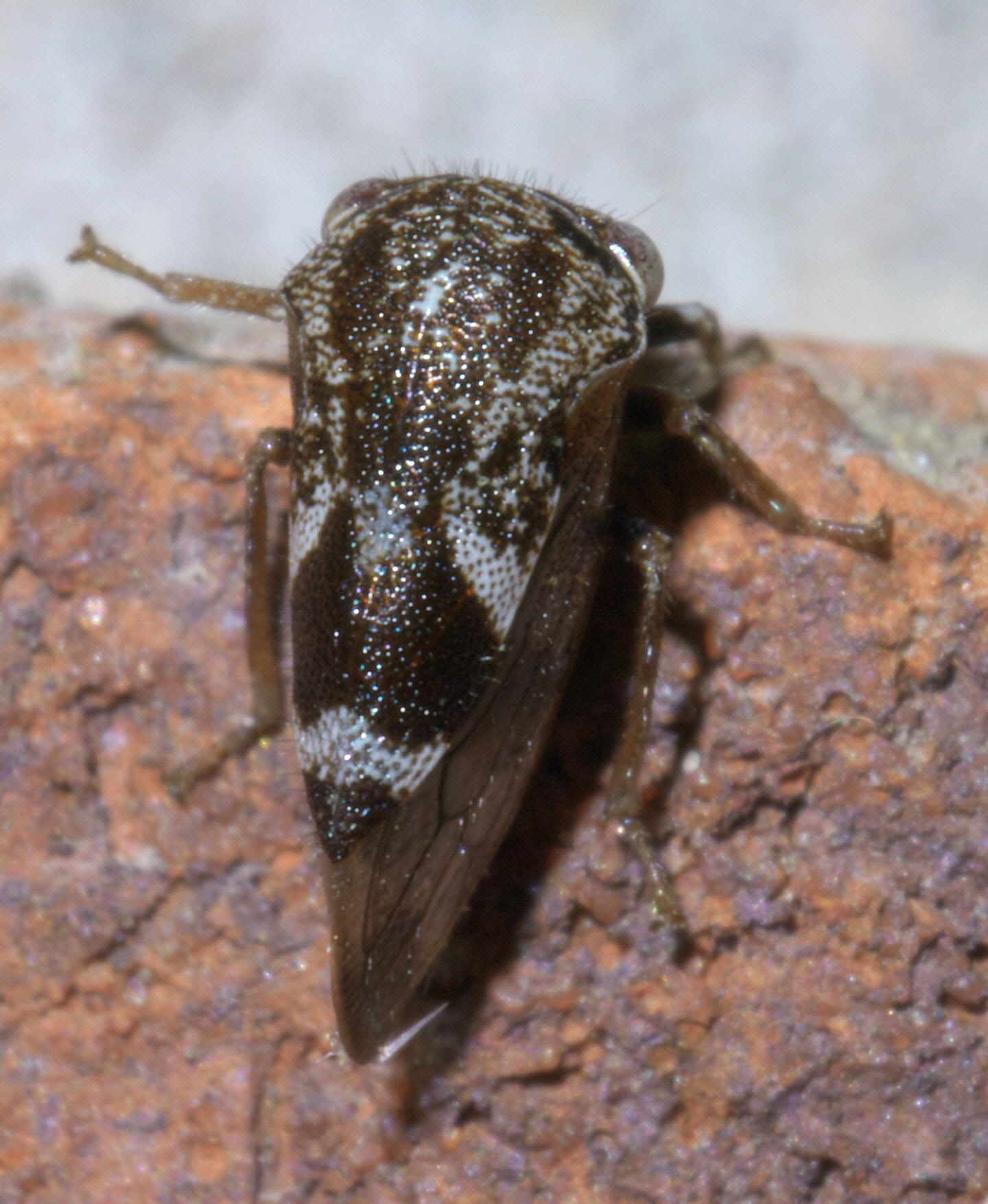

Scientific classification
- Domain: Eukaryota
- Kingdom: Animalia
- Phylum: Arthropoda
- Class: Insecta
- Order: Hemiptera
- Suborder: Auchenorrhyncha
- Family: Membracidae
- Genus: Ophiderma
- Species: O. salamandra

Binomial name
- Ophiderma salamandra Fairmaire, 1846

= Ophiderma salamandra =

Species of true bug

Ophiderma salamandra is a species of treehopper in the family Membracidae.

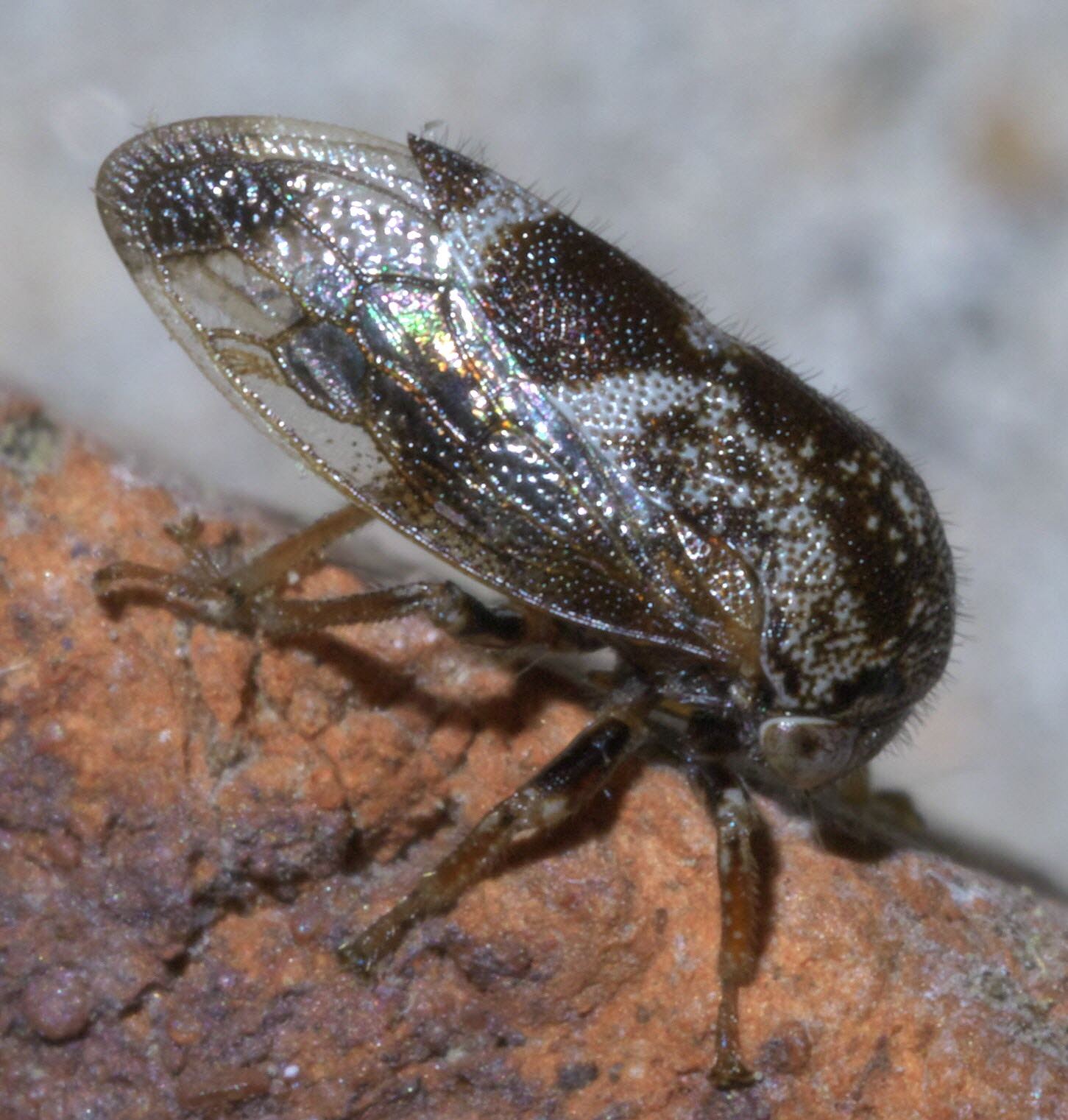
