= Cyrtolobus arizonae =

Scientific classification
- Kingdom: Animalia
- Phylum: Arthropoda
- Class: Insecta
- Order: Hemiptera
- Suborder: Auchenorrhyncha
- Family: Membracidae
- Genus: Cyrtolobus
- Species: C. arizonae

Binomial name
- Cyrtolobus arizonae Ball, 1932

Species of treehopper

Cyrtolobus arizonae is a species of treehopper belonging to the genus Cyrtolobus in the family Membracidae. It was first described by Elmer Darwin Ball in 1932.

== Description ==
Cyrtolobus arizonae is orange-yellow with white stripes across the pronotal crest. Males are 5 mm while females are 6 mm.

== Distribution ==
Cyrtolobus arizonae is found in southwestern United States, primarily in Arizona.
