= Cyrtolobus coronatus =

Scientific classification
- Kingdom: Animalia
- Phylum: Arthropoda
- Class: Insecta
- Order: Hemiptera
- Suborder: Auchenorrhyncha
- Family: Membracidae
- Genus: Cyrtolobus
- Species: C. coronatus

Binomial name
- Cyrtolobus coronatus Ball

Species of treehopper

Cyrtolobus coronatus is a species of treehopper belonging to the family Membracidae.
