= Cyrtolobus acuminatus =

Scientific classification
- Domain: Eukaryota
- Kingdom: Animalia
- Phylum: Arthropoda
- Class: Insecta
- Order: Hemiptera
- Suborder: Auchenorrhyncha
- Family: Membracidae
- Genus: Cyrtolobus
- Species: C. acuminatus

Binomial name
- Cyrtolobus acuminatus Woodruff

Species of insect

Cyrtolobus acuminatus is a species of treehopper belonging to the genus Cyrtolobus and was first described by L. B. Woodruff. It is found in midwestern United States.
