= Xantholobus lateralis =

Scientific classification
- Domain: Eukaryota
- Kingdom: Animalia
- Phylum: Arthropoda
- Class: Insecta
- Order: Hemiptera
- Suborder: Auchenorrhyncha
- Family: Membracidae
- Genus: Xantholobus
- Species: X. lateralis

Binomial name
- Xantholobus lateralis Van Duzee, 1908

Species of insect

Xantholobus lateralis is a species of treehopper belonging to the subfamily Smiliinae. It was first described by Edward Payton Van Duzee in 1908.

== Habitat ==
Xantholobus lateralis is found in eastern and central North America, near mixed hardwood forests. It is found from May to June.

== Diet ==
Xantholobus lateralis has been spotted feeding on species of Quercus (oak) and Betula (birch).
