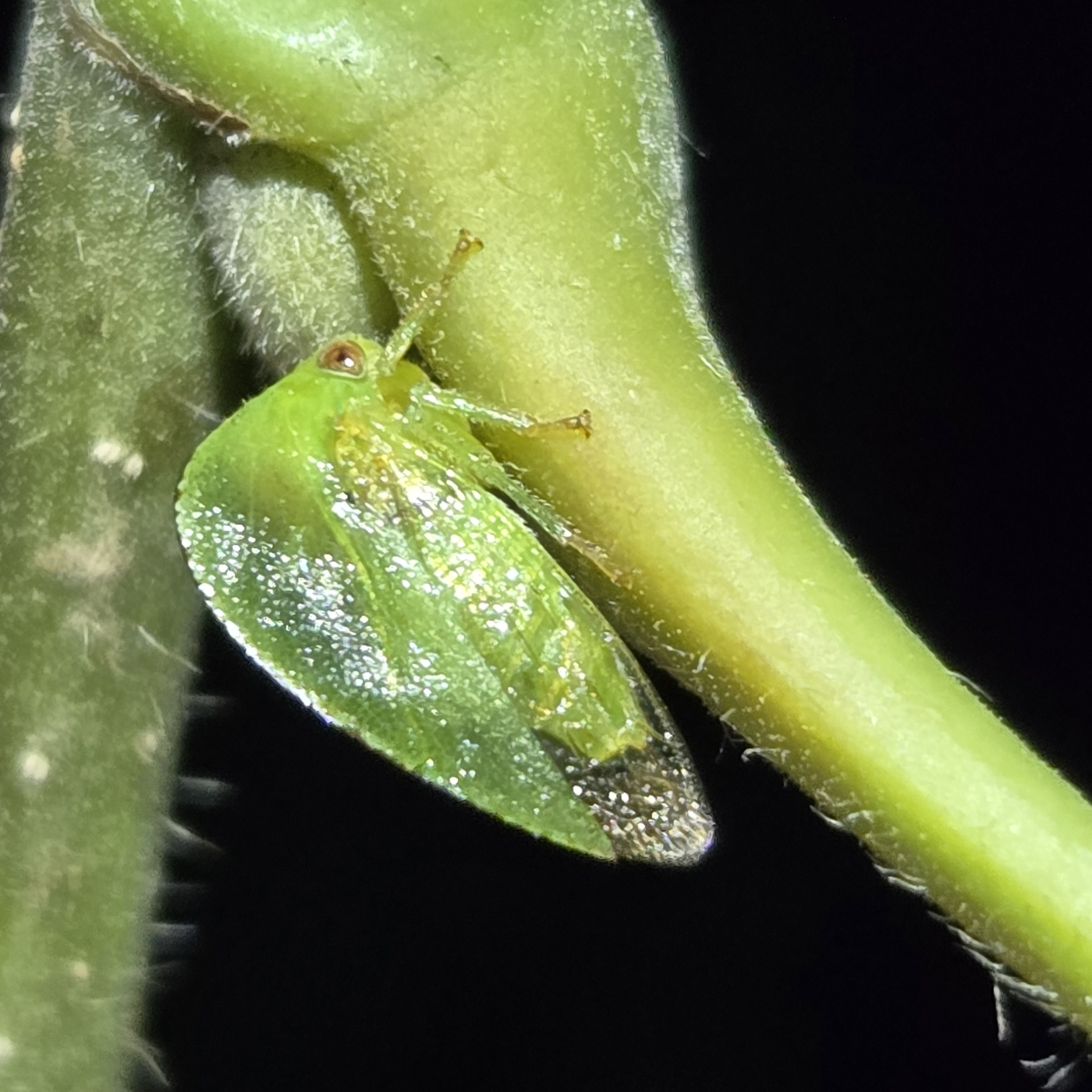

Scientific classification
- Kingdom: Animalia
- Phylum: Arthropoda
- Clade: Pancrustacea
- Class: Insecta
- Order: Hemiptera
- Suborder: Auchenorrhyncha
- Family: Membracidae
- Genus: Atymna
- Species: A. castaneae

Binomial name
- Atymna castaneae Fitch, 1851

= Atymna castaneae =

Species of treehopper

Atymna castaneae is a species of treehopper belonging to the subfamily Smiliinae. It was first described by Asa Fitch in 1851.

== Distribution ==
Atymna castaneae is found across eastern North America. It is commonly found from May to August.

== Diet ==
Atymna castaneae feeds on the trees of the genus Castanea, or chestnut trees, hence the species epithet castaneae. These include the American chestnut (C. dentata) and the Allegheny chinquapin (C. pumila).
