= Grandolobus =

Scientific classification
- Kingdom: Animalia
- Phylum: Arthropoda
- Clade: Pancrustacea
- Class: Insecta
- Order: Hemiptera
- Suborder: Auchenorrhyncha
- Family: Membracidae
- Tribe: Smiliini
- Genus: Grandolobus; Ball, 1932

Genus of insects

Grandolobus is a genus of treehoppers in the subfamily Smiliinae.

== Species ==
There are three species recognised in the genus Grandolobus:

- Grandolobus grandis Van Duzee
- Grandolobus inaequalis Fowler
- Grandolobus vittatipennis Fowler
