= Cyrtolobus cristifera =

Scientific classification
- Kingdom: Animalia
- Phylum: Arthropoda
- Clade: Pancrustacea
- Class: Insecta
- Order: Hemiptera
- Suborder: Auchenorrhyncha
- Family: Membracidae
- Genus: Cyrtolobus
- Species: C. cristifera

Binomial name
- Cyrtolobus cristifera Stål

Species of treehopper

Cyrtolobus cristifera is a species of treehopper belonging to the family Membracidae.
