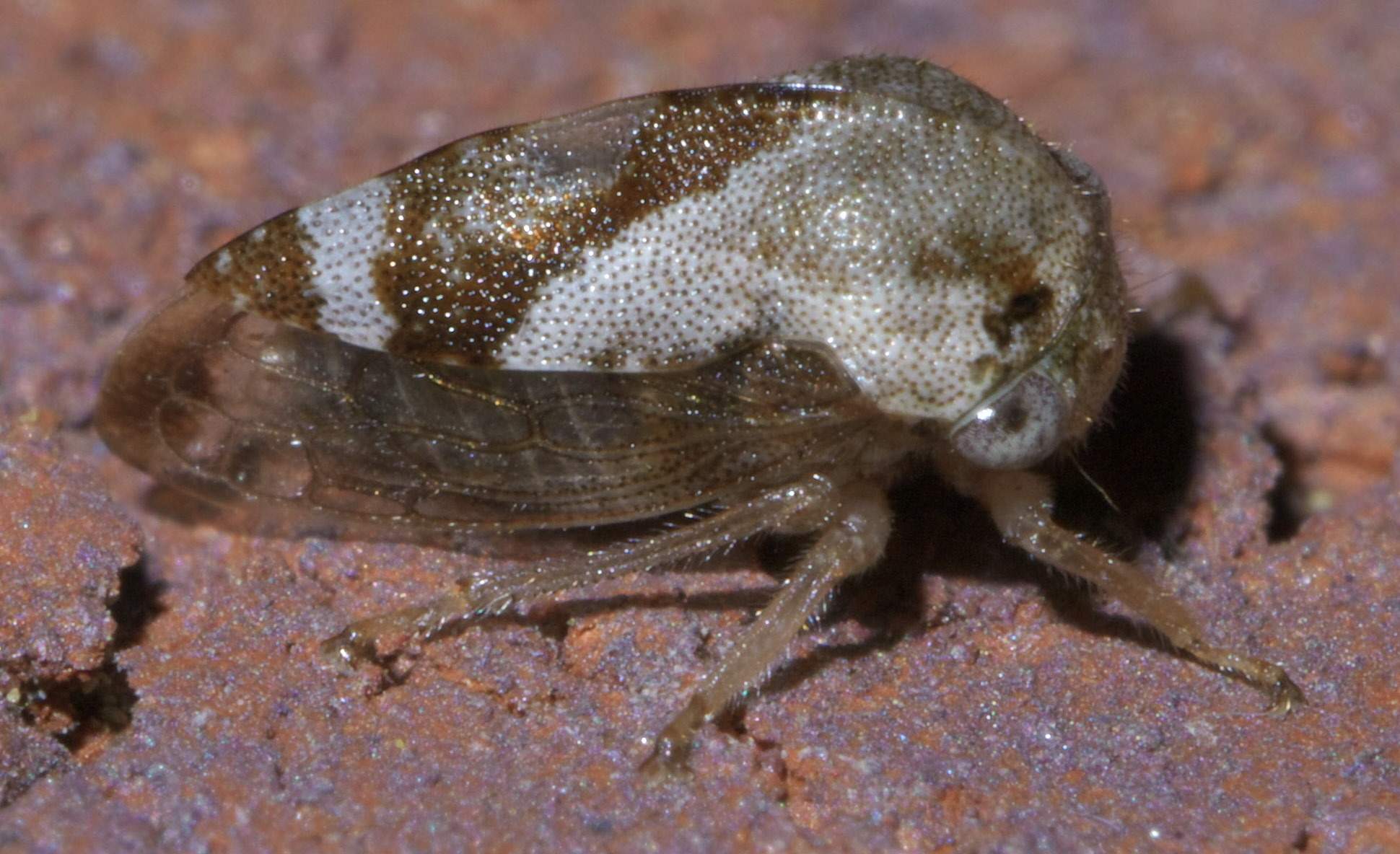
- Cyrtolobus, Oklahoma

Scientific classification
- Kingdom: Animalia
- Phylum: Arthropoda
- Class: Insecta
- Order: Hemiptera
- Suborder: Auchenorrhyncha
- Family: Membracidae
- Subfamily: Smiliinae
- Tribe: Smiliini
- Genus: Cyrtolobus; Goding, 1894

Synonyms
- Cyrtologus Woodruff, 1916; Cyrtosia Fitch, 1851

= Cyrtolobus =

Genus of insects

Cyrtolobus is a genus of treehoppers in the family Membracidae. There are more than 50 described species in Cyrtolobus, found in North and Central America.

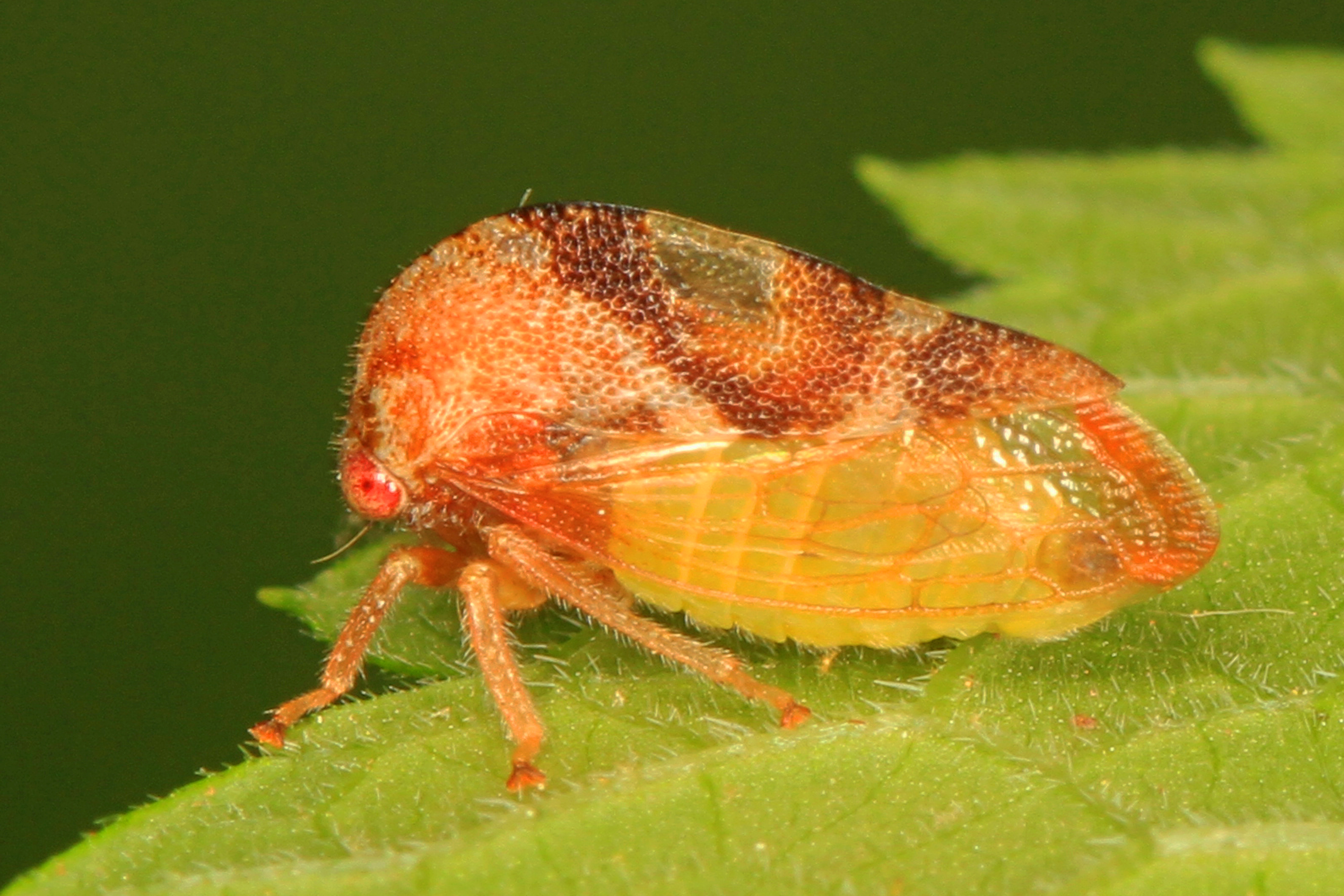
Cyrtolobus vau

== Species ==
These 54 species belong to the genus Cyrtolobus:

- Cyrtolobus acuminatus Woodruff, 1924
- Cyrtolobus acutus Van Duzee, 1908
- Cyrtolobus arcuata Emmons
- Cyrtolobus arcuatus
- Cyrtolobus arizonae Ball, 1932
- Cyrtolobus auroreus Woodruff
- Cyrtolobus celsus Van Duzee, 1916
- Cyrtolobus cinctus Van Duzee, 1908
- Cyrtolobus cinerea Emmons
- Cyrtolobus cinereus (Emmons, 1854)
- Cyrtolobus clarus Woodruff
- Cyrtolobus coronatus Ball, 1932
- Cyrtolobus cristifera Stål
- Cyrtolobus discoidalis Emmons, 1854
- Cyrtolobus distinguendus Fowler
- Cyrtolobus dixianus Woodruff
- Cyrtolobus fenestrata Fitch
- Cyrtolobus fenestratus
- Cyrtolobus flavolatus Woodruff
- Cyrtolobus frigidus Ball, 1932
- Cyrtolobus fuliginosa Emmons
- Cyrtolobus fuliginosus
- Cyrtolobus funkhouseri Woodruff
- Cyrtolobus fuscipennis Van Duzee, 1908
- Cyrtolobus gloveri Goding, 1893
- Cyrtolobus gramatanus Woodruff
- Cyrtolobus gratiosus Woodruff, 1924
- Cyrtolobus griseus Van Duzee
- Cyrtolobus inaequalis
- Cyrtolobus inermis Emmons
- Cyrtolobus limus Van Duzee, 1908
- Cyrtolobus maculifrontis Emmons
- Cyrtolobus maxinei Dennis, 1970
- Cyrtolobus muticus
- Cyrtolobus oblongatus Ball, 1932
- Cyrtolobus ovatus Van Duzee
- Cyrtolobus pallidifrontis (Emmons, 1854)
- Cyrtolobus parvulus Woodruff
- Cyrtolobus pictus Van Duzee, 1925
- Cyrtolobus pulchellus Woodruff
- Cyrtolobus puritanus Woodruff, 1924
- Cyrtolobus rufulus Woodruff, 1924
- Cyrtolobus sculpta Fairmaire
- Cyrtolobus sculptus (Fairmaire, 1846)
- Cyrtolobus semifascia
- Cyrtolobus togatus Woodruff, 1924
- Cyrtolobus tuberosa Fairmaire
- Cyrtolobus tuberosus (Fairmaire, 1846)
- Cyrtolobus vanduzii Goding
- Cyrtolobus vau (Say, 1830)
- Cyrtolobus virescens Fowler
- Cyrtolobus viridis (Emmons, 1854)
- Cyrtolobus woodruffi Ball, 1932
