= Cyrtolobus funkhouseri =

Scientific classification
- Kingdom: Animalia
- Phylum: Arthropoda
- Class: Insecta
- Order: Hemiptera
- Suborder: Auchenorrhyncha
- Family: Membracidae
- Genus: Cyrtolobus
- Species: C. funkhouseri

Binomial name
- Cyrtolobus funkhouseri Woodruff, 1924

Species of treehopper

Cyrtolobus funkhouseri is a species of treehopper belonging to the family Membracidae.
