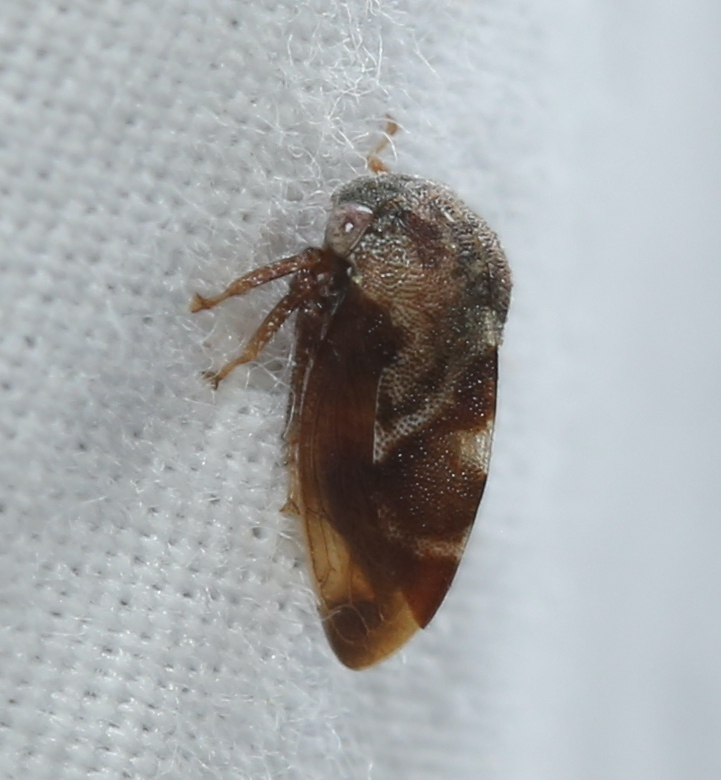

Scientific classification
- Kingdom: Animalia
- Phylum: Arthropoda
- Class: Insecta
- Order: Hemiptera
- Suborder: Auchenorrhyncha
- Family: Membracidae
- Genus: Cyrtolobus
- Species: C. fuscipennis

Binomial name
- Cyrtolobus fuscipennis Van Duzee, 1908

= Cyrtolobus fuscipennis =

Species of insect

Cyrtolobus fuscipennis is a species of treehopper belonging to the genus Cyrtolobus. It was first described by the American entomologist Edward Payson Van Duzee in 1908.

== Description ==
Males are 5.5 millimetres in length while females are 6 millimetres. They are usually reddish-brown in color but vary highly.

== Habitat ==
Cyrtolobus fuscipennis is found in eastern and midwestern United States, but can reach as far west as the Rocky Mountains.
