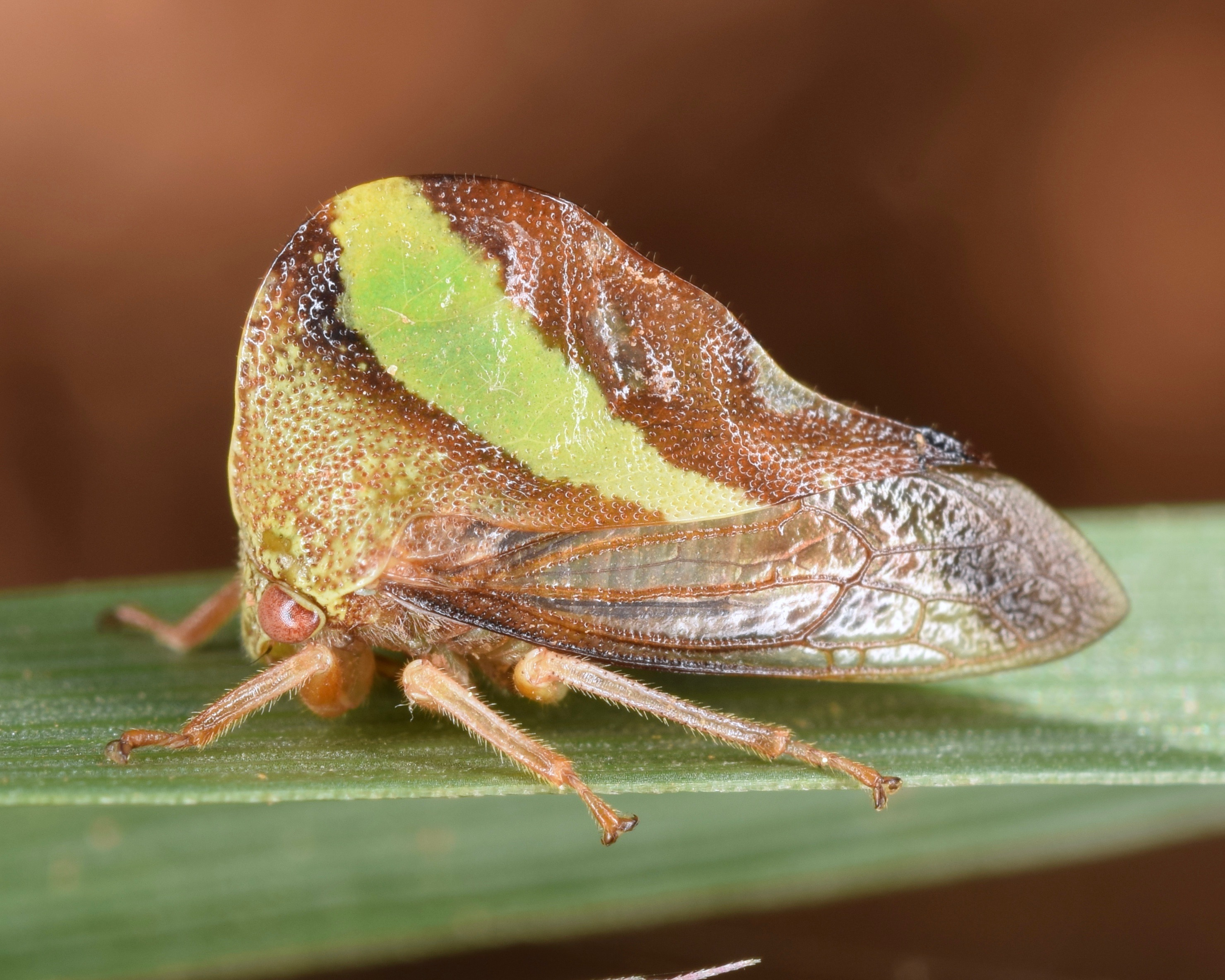

Scientific classification
- Domain: Eukaryota
- Kingdom: Animalia
- Phylum: Arthropoda
- Class: Insecta
- Order: Hemiptera
- Suborder: Auchenorrhyncha
- Family: Membracidae
- Subfamily: Smiliinae
- Tribe: Smiliini
- Genus: Smilia; Germar, 1833

= Smilia =

Genus of insects

Smilia is a genus of treehoppers belonging to the tribe Smiliini in the subfamily Smiliinae. There are at least two described species in the genus.

== Species ==
- Smilia camelus (camel treehopper) Fabricius, 1803
- Smilia fasciata Amyot and Serville, 1843
