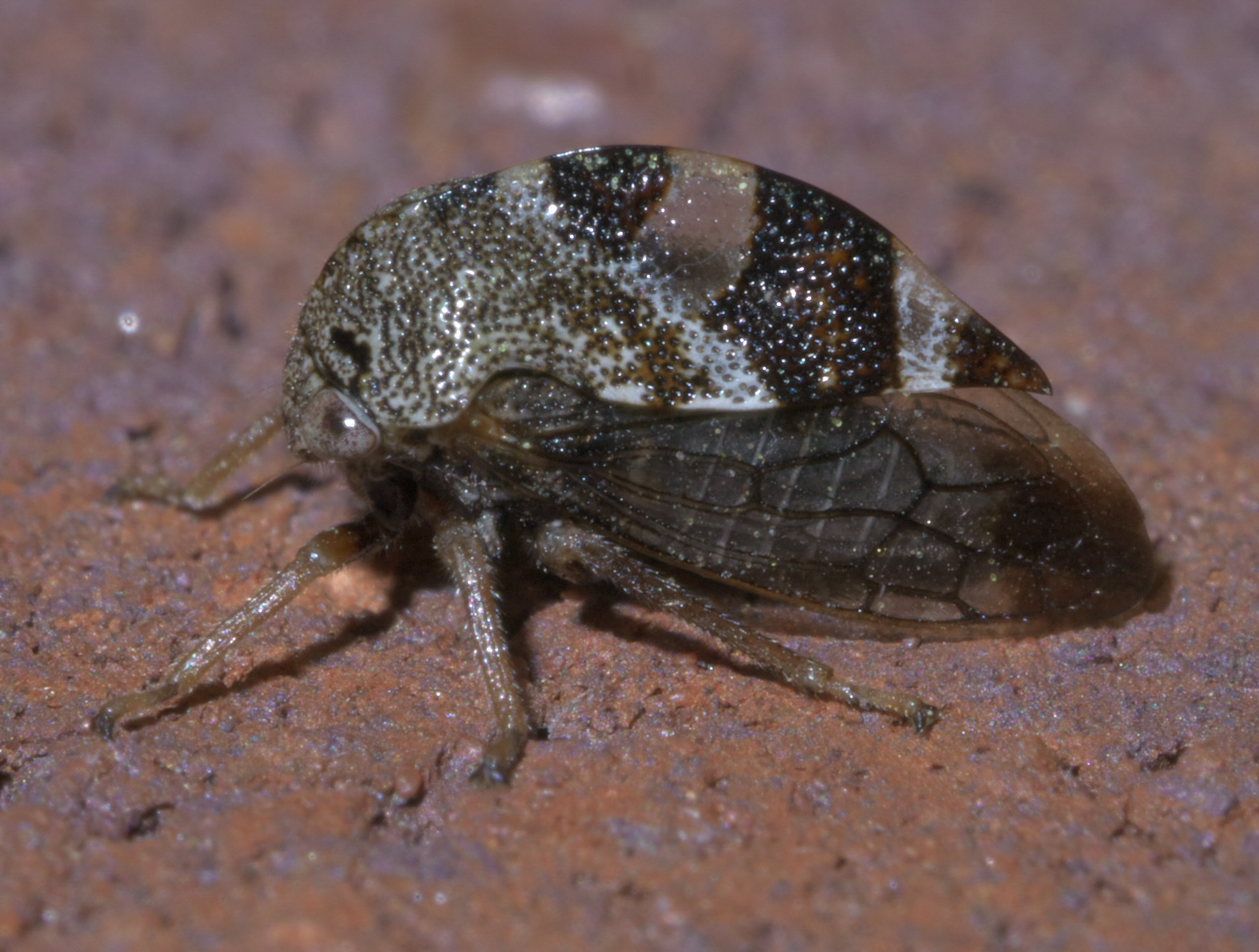

Scientific classification
- Kingdom: Animalia
- Phylum: Arthropoda
- Class: Insecta
- Order: Hemiptera
- Suborder: Auchenorrhyncha
- Family: Membracidae
- Genus: Cyrtolobus
- Species: C. tuberosus

Binomial name
- Cyrtolobus tuberosus (Fairmaire, 1846)

= Cyrtolobus tuberosus =

Species of treehopper

Cyrtolobus tuberosus is a species of treehopper belonging to the genus Cyrtolobus. It was first described by Léon Fairmaire in 1846 as Thelia tuberosa. It is the largest treehopper in the Cyrtolobus genus, 9–10mm for females and 7–8mm for males.

== Habitat ==
Cyrtolobus tuberosus is found across the eastern and central United States. It feeds on many types of oaks (Quercus), such as:

- Quercus alba
- Q. margarettae
- Q. marilandica
- Q. nigra
- Q. prinus
- Q. rubra
- Q. stellata
- Q. virginiana

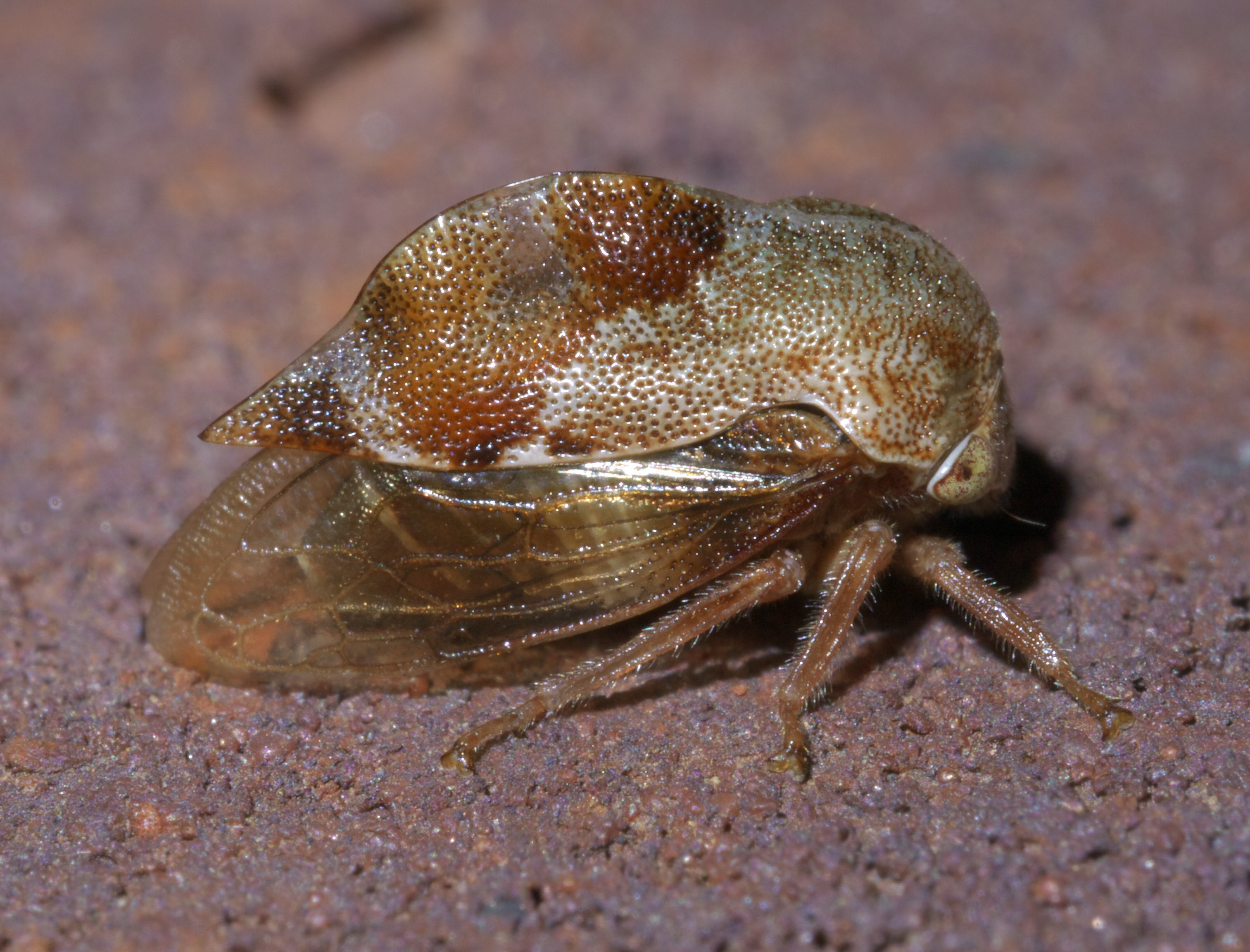
Cyrtolobus tuberosus specimen, 8.1 millimetres

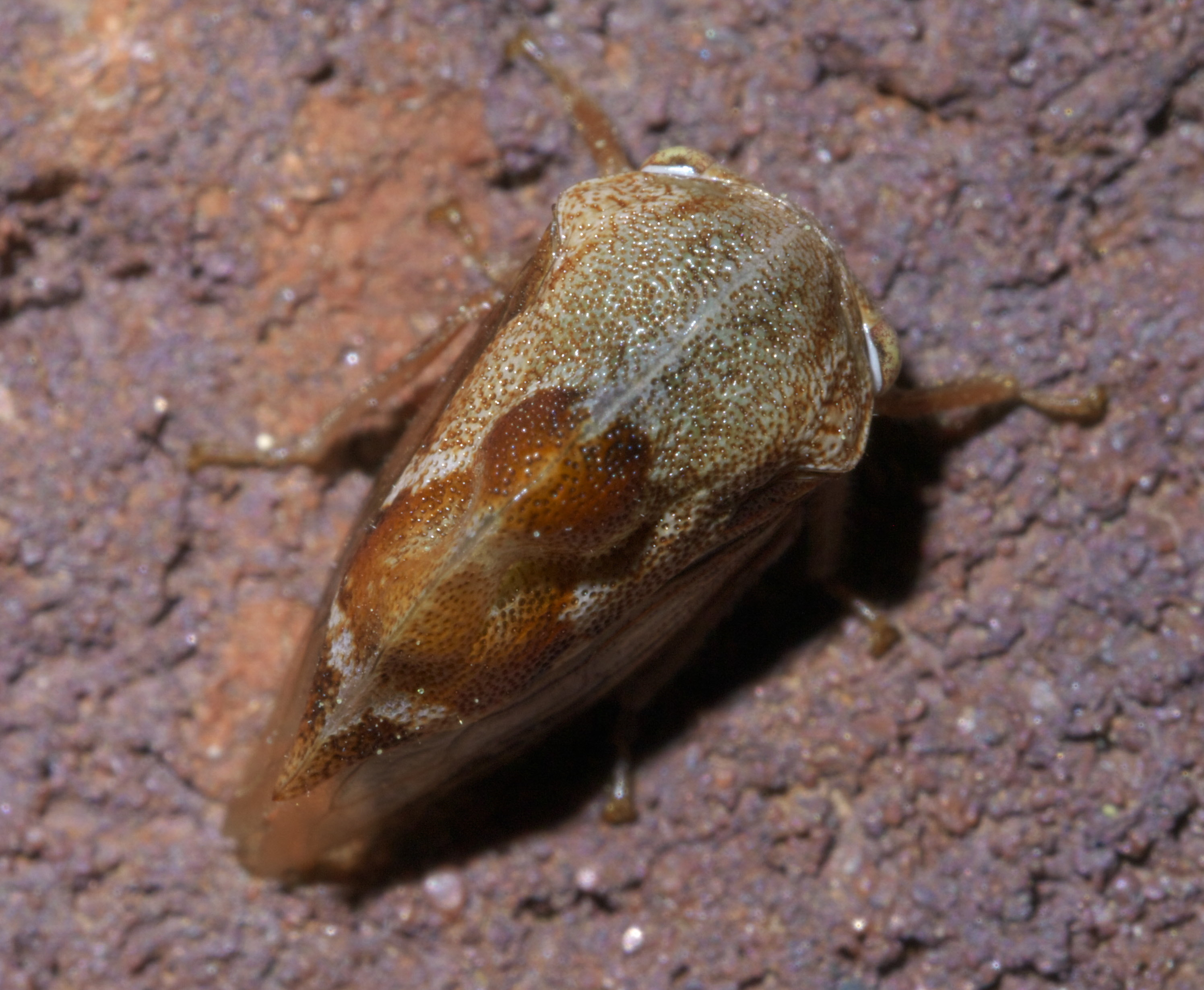
Cyrtolobus tuberosus, top view
