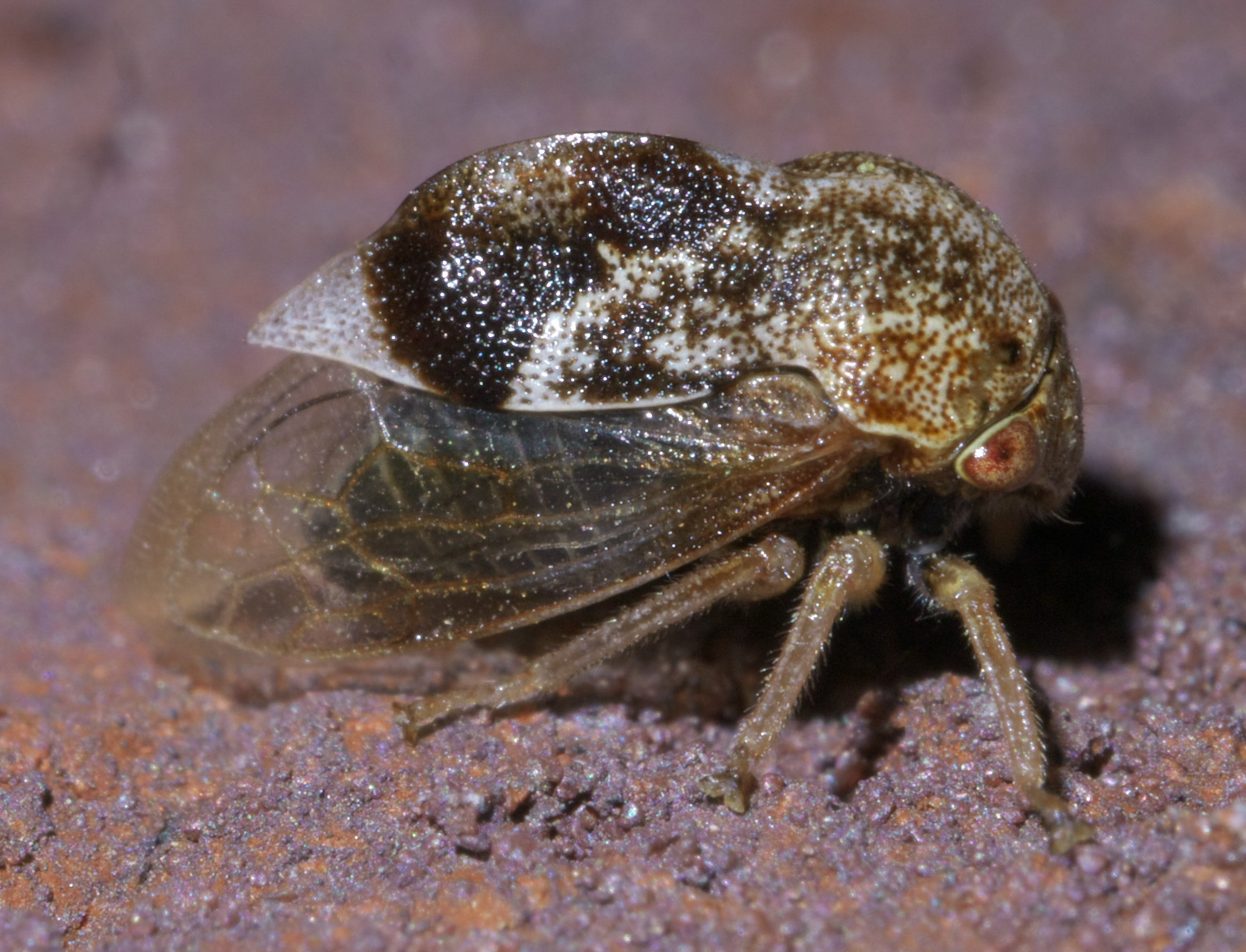

Scientific classification
- Domain: Eukaryota
- Kingdom: Animalia
- Phylum: Arthropoda
- Class: Insecta
- Order: Hemiptera
- Suborder: Auchenorrhyncha
- Family: Membracidae
- Genus: Xantholobus
- Species: X. muticus

Binomial name
- Xantholobus muticus Fabricius, 1777

= Xantholobus muticus =

Species of insect

Xantholobus muticus is a species of treehopper belonging to the subfamily Smiliinae.

== Description ==
Xantholobus muticus varies in color from black to pale yellowish brown. The pronotum is low and rounded, and swells over the middle. Adults vary in length from 7 to 8 millimetres.

== Range ==
Xantholobus muticus can be found across the eastern and central parts of United States and Canada, stretching from Manitoba to Quebec in the north and from Texas to Florida in the south.

== Habitat ==
Xantholobus muticus is commonly found in mixed hardwood forests, primarily where oak (Quercus) trees are present. It can be found from the late spring months to the early summer months.

== Diet ==
Like all treehoppers, Xantholobus muticus feeds on the sap from under leaves. However, X. muticus feeds exclusively on the trees of the genus Quercus, or oaks, including:

- Quercus alba
- Q. laevis
- Q. prinus
- Q. stellata

== Taxonomy ==
Xantholobus muticus was first described by Johan C. Fabricius as Membracis mutica. The species has been under several taxonomic changes. Xantholobus muticus is also called Xantholobus mutica.
