= Cyrtolobus celsus =

Scientific classification
- Domain: Eukaryota
- Kingdom: Animalia
- Phylum: Arthropoda
- Class: Insecta
- Order: Hemiptera
- Suborder: Auchenorrhyncha
- Family: Membracidae
- Genus: Cyrtolobus
- Species: C. celsus

Binomial name
- Cyrtolobus celsus Van Duzee, 1916

Species of insect

Cyrtolobus celsus is a species of treehopper belonging to the genus Cyrtolobus. It was first described by Edward P. Van Duzee in 1916.

== Habitat ==
Cyrtolobus celsus is found across eastern and Midwest United States.
