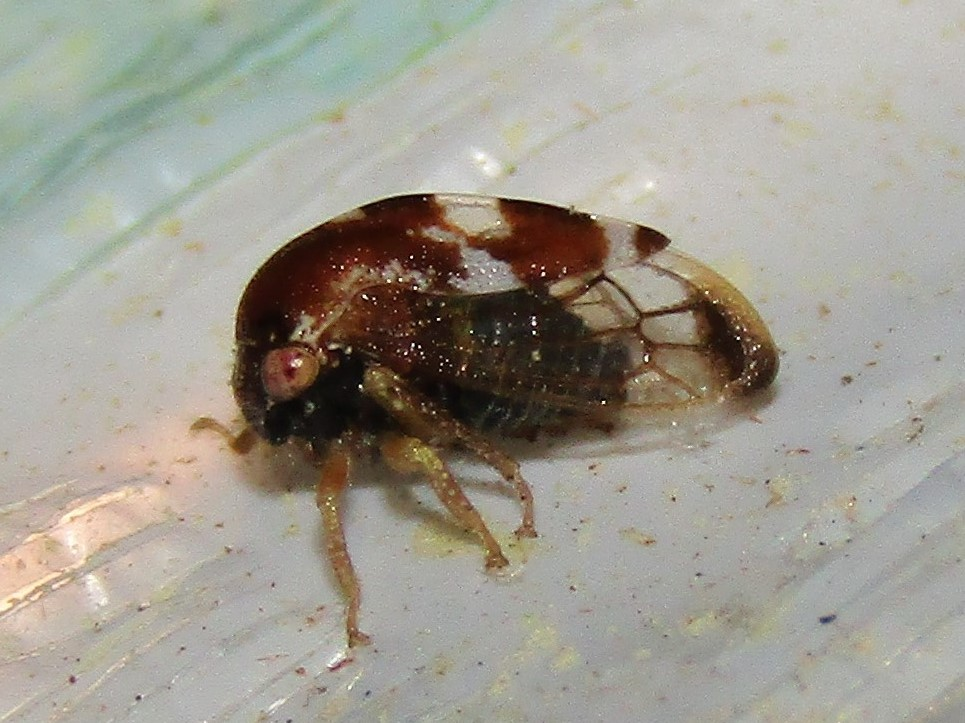

Scientific classification
- Domain: Eukaryota
- Kingdom: Animalia
- Phylum: Arthropoda
- Class: Insecta
- Order: Hemiptera
- Suborder: Auchenorrhyncha
- Family: Membracidae
- Genus: Cyrtolobus
- Species: C. togatus

Binomial name
- Cyrtolobus togatus Woodruff, 1924

= Cyrtolobus togatus =

Species of treehopper

Cyrtolobus togatus is a species of treehopper first described by L. B. Woodruff in 1924.

== Habitat ==
Cyrtolobus togatus is found across the eastern United States. It feeds on many types of oaks, including:

- Water oak (Quercus nigra)
- Willow oak (Quercus phellos)
- Post oak (Quercus stellata)
- Laurel oak (Quercus laurifolia)
