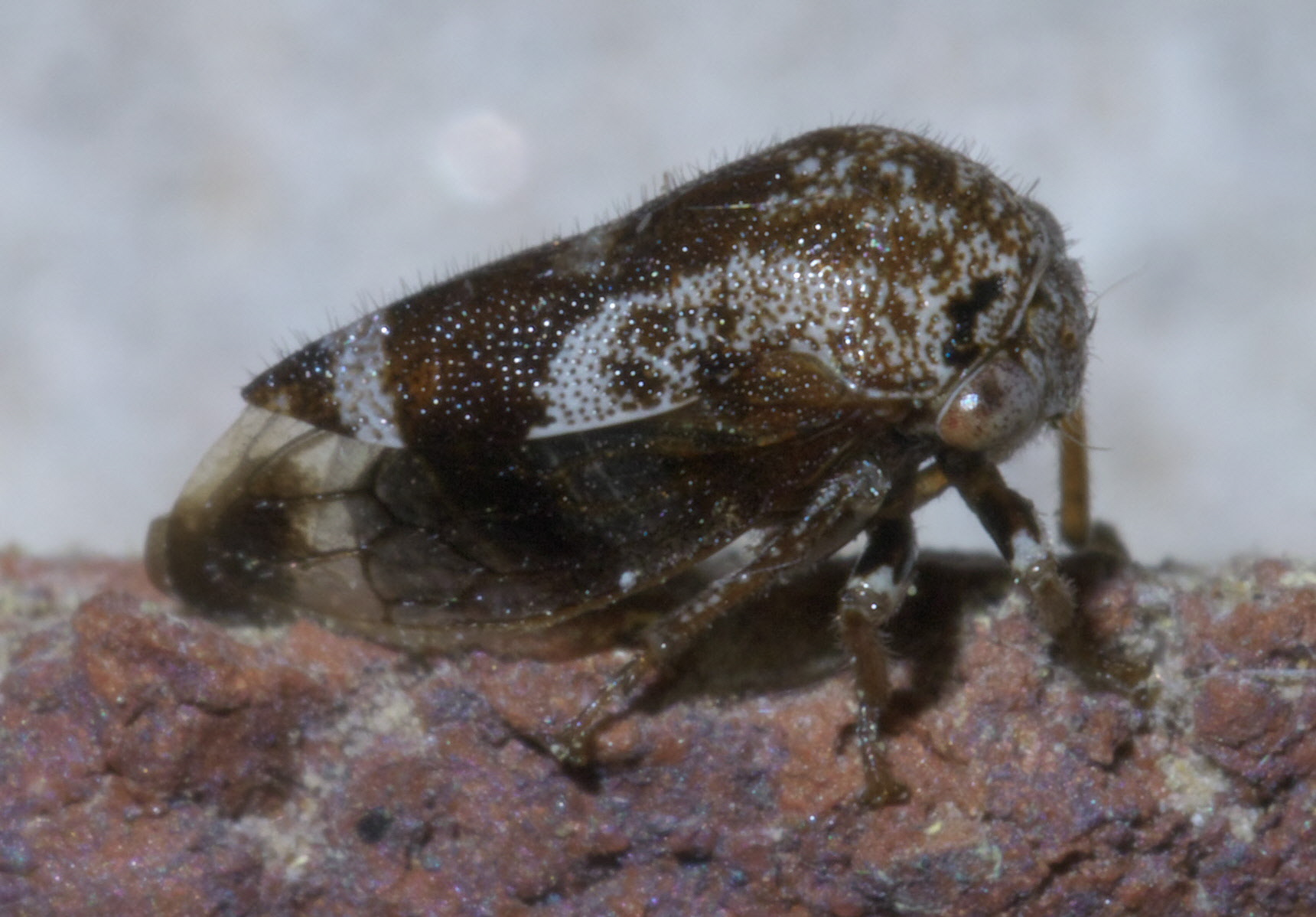

Scientific classification
- Kingdom: Animalia
- Phylum: Arthropoda
- Clade: Pancrustacea
- Class: Insecta
- Order: Hemiptera
- Suborder: Auchenorrhyncha
- Family: Membracidae
- Subfamily: Smiliinae
- Tribe: Smiliini
- Genus: Ophiderma; Fairmaire, 1847

= Ophiderma =

Genus of true bugs

Ophiderma is a genus of treehoppers in the family Membracidae. There are about 17 described species in Ophiderma.

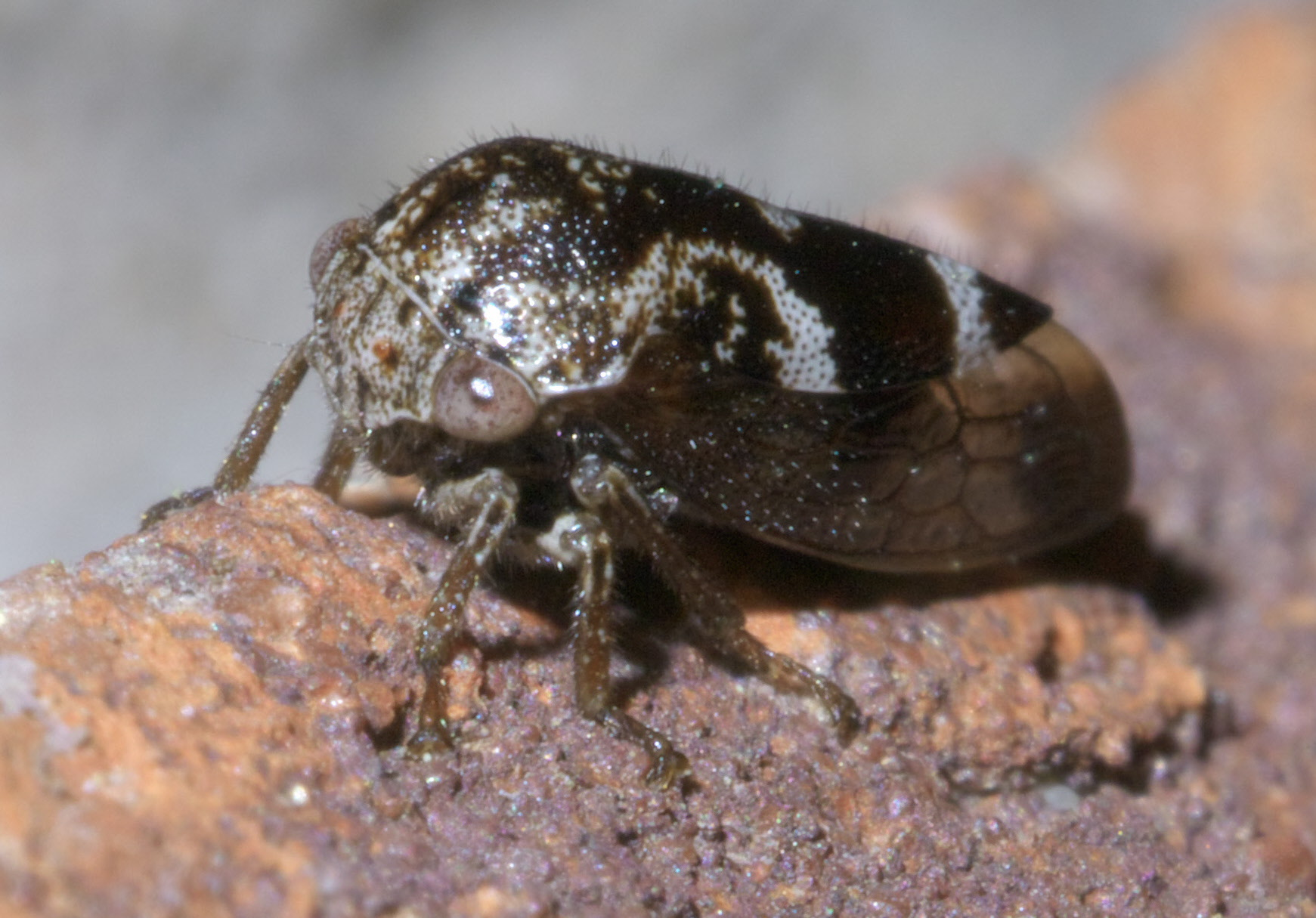

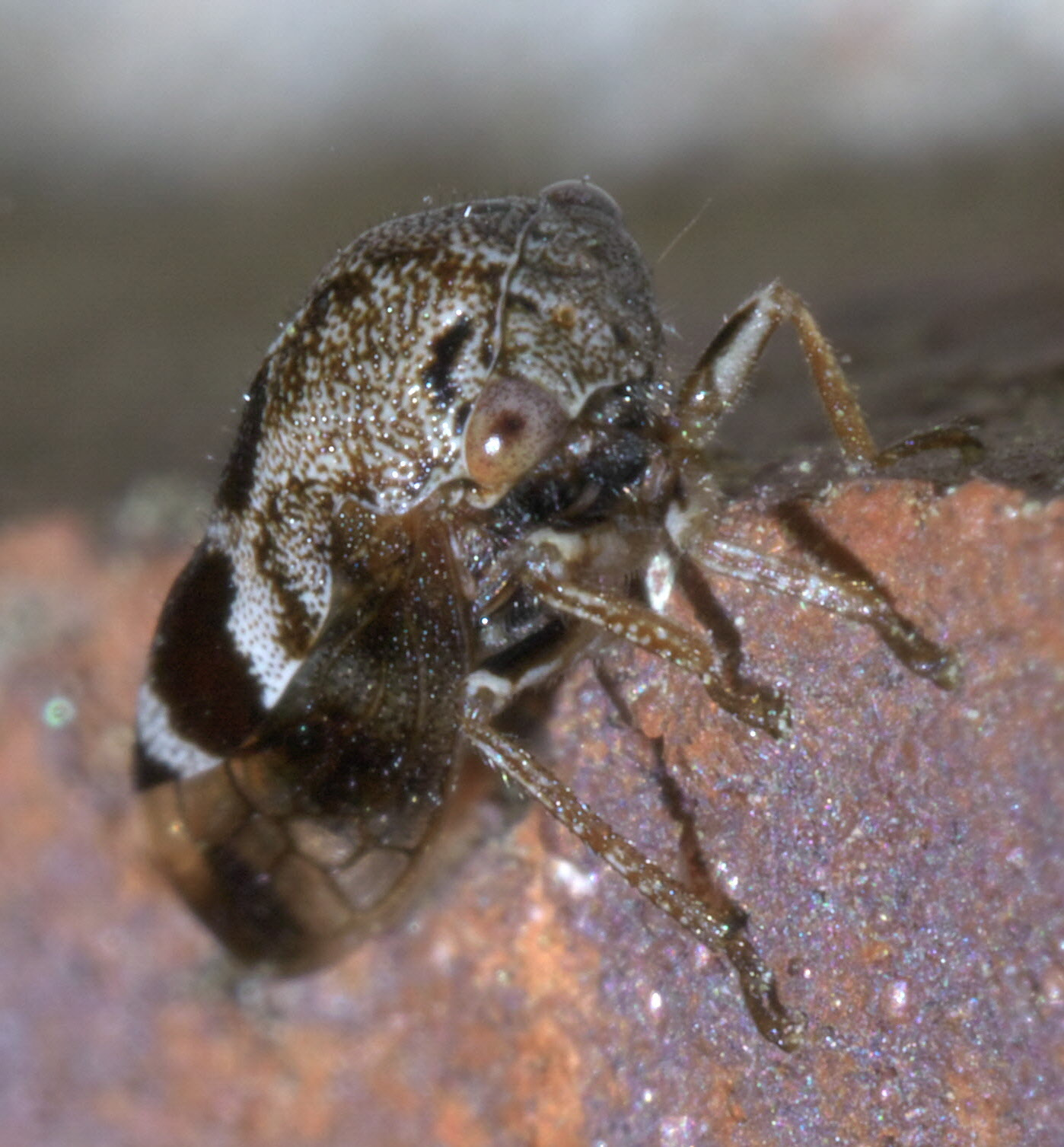

== Species ==
These 17 species belong to the genus Ophiderma:

- Ophiderma compactum Gibson & Wells^{c g}
- Ophiderma definitum Woodruff, 1919^{c g b}
- Ophiderma evelyna Woodruff^{c g b}
- Ophiderma flavicephala Goding^{c g b}
- Ophiderma flavum Goding^{c g b}
- Ophiderma gloveri Goding 1893^{c g}
- Ophiderma griseum Woodruff^{c g b}
- Ophiderma infantile Ball^{c g}
- Ophiderma mus Fowler^{c g}
- Ophiderma pallidum Van Duzee^{c g}
- Ophiderma panda Ball^{c g}
- Ophiderma planeflavum Fairmaire^{c g}
- Ophiderma pubescens Emmons^{c g b}
- Ophiderma salamandra Fairmaire, 1846^{c g b}
- Ophiderma stonei Ball^{c g b}
- Ophiderma tricinctum Ball^{c g}

Data sources: i = ITIS, c = Catalogue of Life, g = GBIF, b = Bugguide.net

Else: Ophiderma fascipennis Funkhouser, 1919 [= Paraphetea fascipennis (Funkhouser, 1919)]
