= Cyrtolobus maxinei =

Scientific classification
- Kingdom: Animalia
- Phylum: Arthropoda
- Class: Insecta
- Order: Hemiptera
- Suborder: Auchenorrhyncha
- Family: Membracidae
- Genus: Cyrtolobus
- Species: C. maxinei

Binomial name
- Cyrtolobus maxinei Dennis, 1970

Species of insect

Cyrtolobus maxinei is a species of treehopper belonging to the genus Cyrtolobus. It was first described by R. W. G. Dennis in 1970.

== Habitat ==
Cyrtolobus maxinei is found in the midwestern United States, mainly in Wisconsin.
