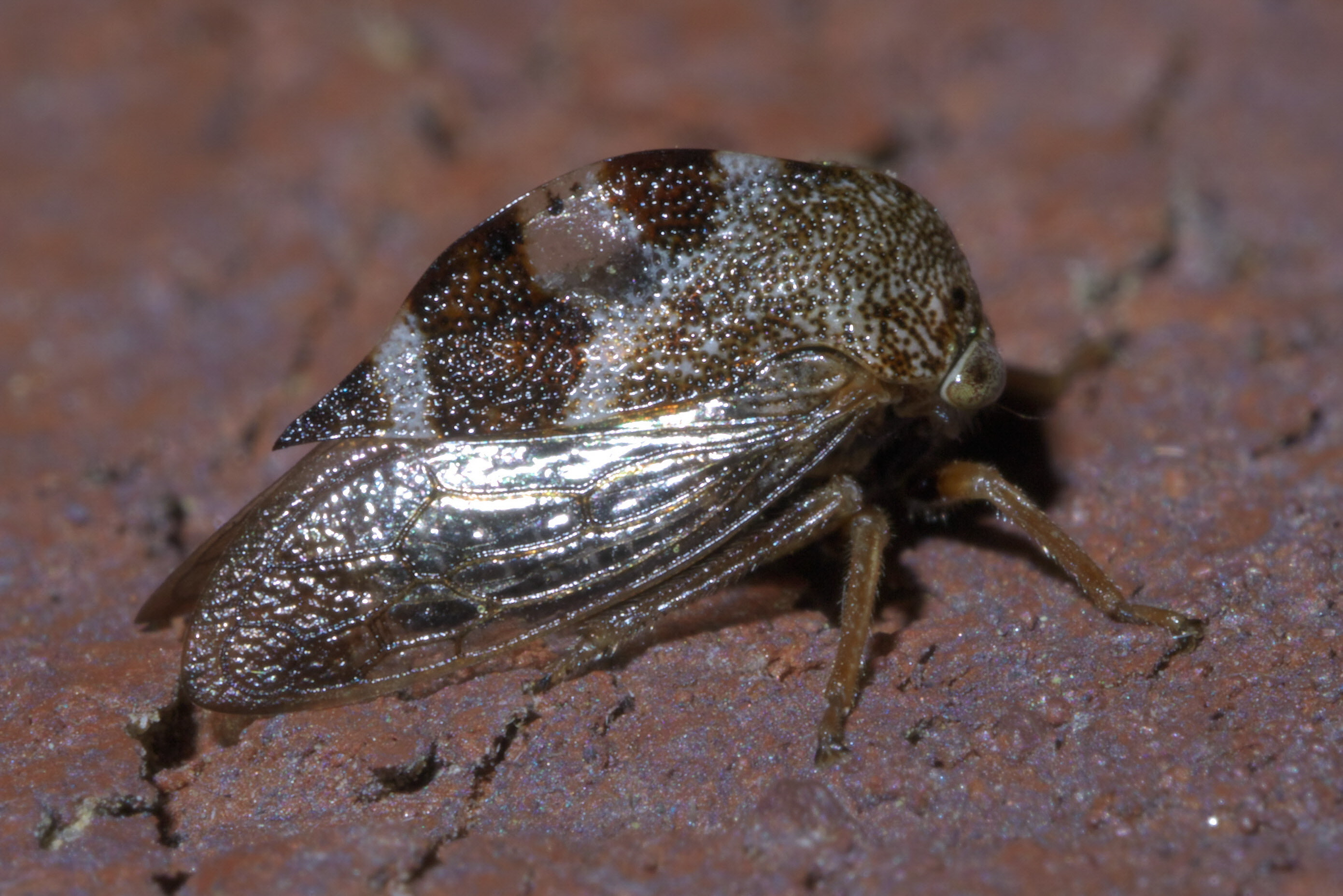
- Cyrtolobus

Scientific classification
- Domain: Eukaryota
- Kingdom: Animalia
- Phylum: Arthropoda
- Class: Insecta
- Order: Hemiptera
- Suborder: Auchenorrhyncha
- Family: Membracidae
- Subfamily: Smiliinae
- Tribe: Smiliini

= Smiliini =

Tribe of treehoppers

Smiliini is a tribe of treehoppers in the family Membracidae. There are about 6 genera and at least 40 described species in Smiliini.

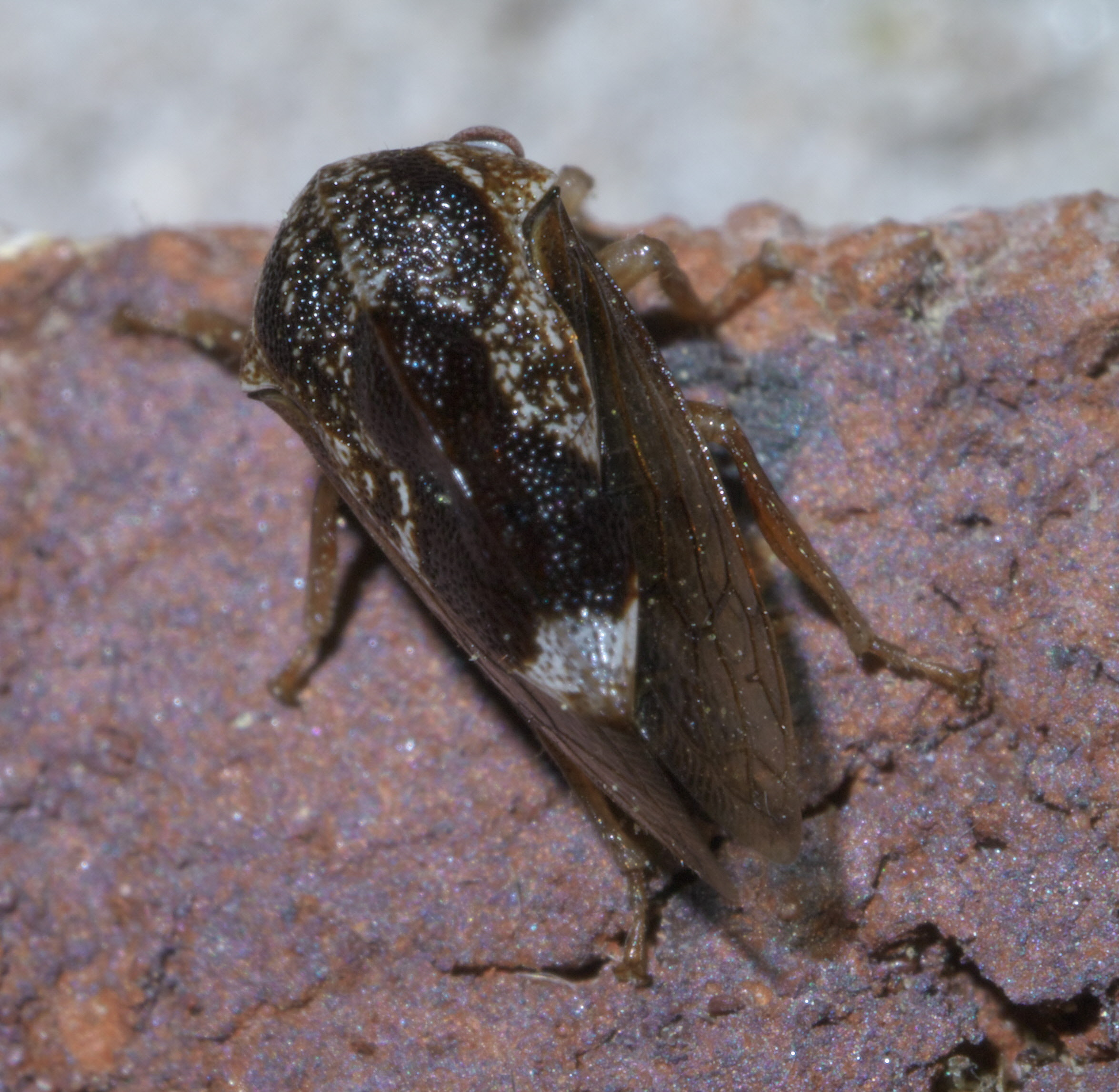
Xantholobus

== Genera ==
These seven genera belong to the tribe Smiliini:

- Atymna Stål, 1867^{c g b}
- Atymnina Plummer, 1938^{c g}
- Cyrtolobus Goding, 1894^{c g b}
- Grandolobus Ball, 1932^{c g b}
- Ophiderma Fairmaire, 1847^{c g b}
- Smilia Germar, 1833^{c g b}
- Xantholobus Van Duzee, 1908^{c g b}

Data sources: i = ITIS, c = Catalogue of Life, g = GBIF, b = Bugguide.net
