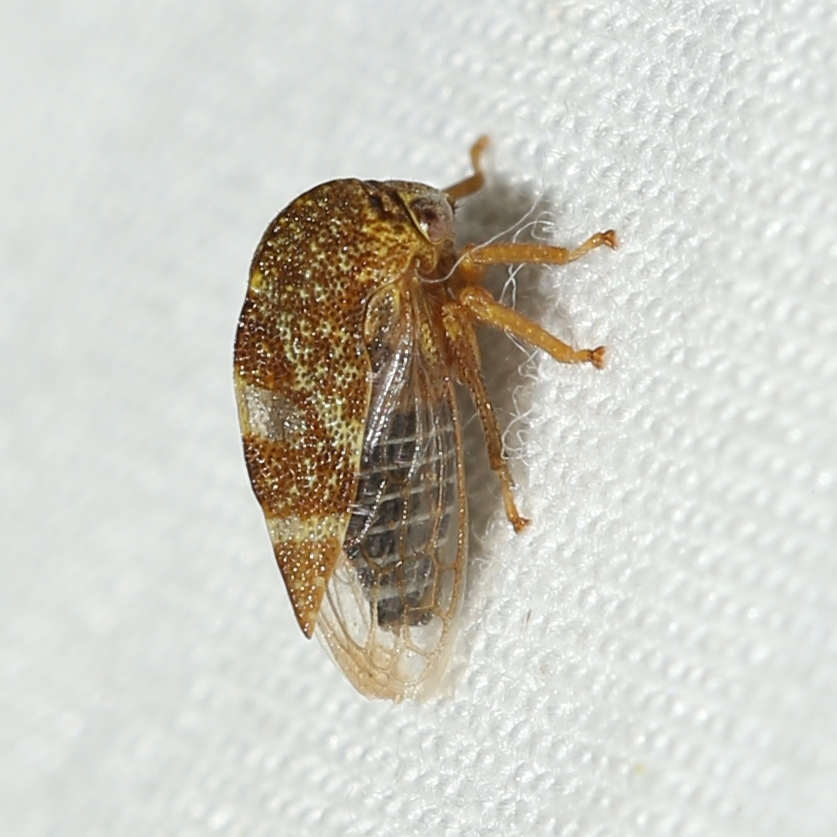

Scientific classification
- Kingdom: Animalia
- Phylum: Arthropoda
- Class: Insecta
- Order: Hemiptera
- Suborder: Auchenorrhyncha
- Family: Membracidae
- Genus: Cyrtolobus
- Species: C. clarus

Binomial name
- Cyrtolobus clarus Woodruff, 1924

= Cyrtolobus clarus =

Species of insect

Cyrtolobus clarus is a species of treehopper belonging to the genus Cyrtolobus and the family Membracidae.

== Distribution ==
C. clarus is found in eastern and southeastern parts of the United States.
