= Ophiderma flavum =

Scientific classification
- Kingdom: Animalia
- Phylum: Arthropoda
- Clade: Pancrustacea
- Class: Insecta
- Order: Hemiptera
- Suborder: Auchenorrhyncha
- Family: Membracidae
- Genus: Ophiderma
- Species: O. flavum

Binomial name
- Ophiderma flavum Goding, 1893

Species of insect

Ophiderma flavum is a species of treehopper belonging to the subfamily Smiliinae. It was first described by Frederic Webster Goding in 1893.

== Habitat ==
Ophiderma flavum is found across the eastern portion of North America. It is found in mixed hardwood forests, primarily where species of Quercus (oaks) are present. It is found from June to August.

== Diet ==
Ophiderma flavum feeds on species of Quercus, or oaks. It has been spotted on the white oak (Q. alba) and the northern red oak (Q. rubra).
