= Cyrtolobus arcuatus =

Scientific classification
- Kingdom: Animalia
- Phylum: Arthropoda
- Class: Insecta
- Order: Hemiptera
- Suborder: Auchenorrhyncha
- Family: Membracidae
- Genus: Cyrtolobus
- Species: C. arcuatus

Binomial name
- Cyrtolobus arcuatus Emmons, 1854

Synonyms
- Cyrtolobus arcuata

Species of treehopper

Cyrtolobus arcuatus is a species of treehopper belonging to the family Membracidae. It is found in eastern and southern United States.
