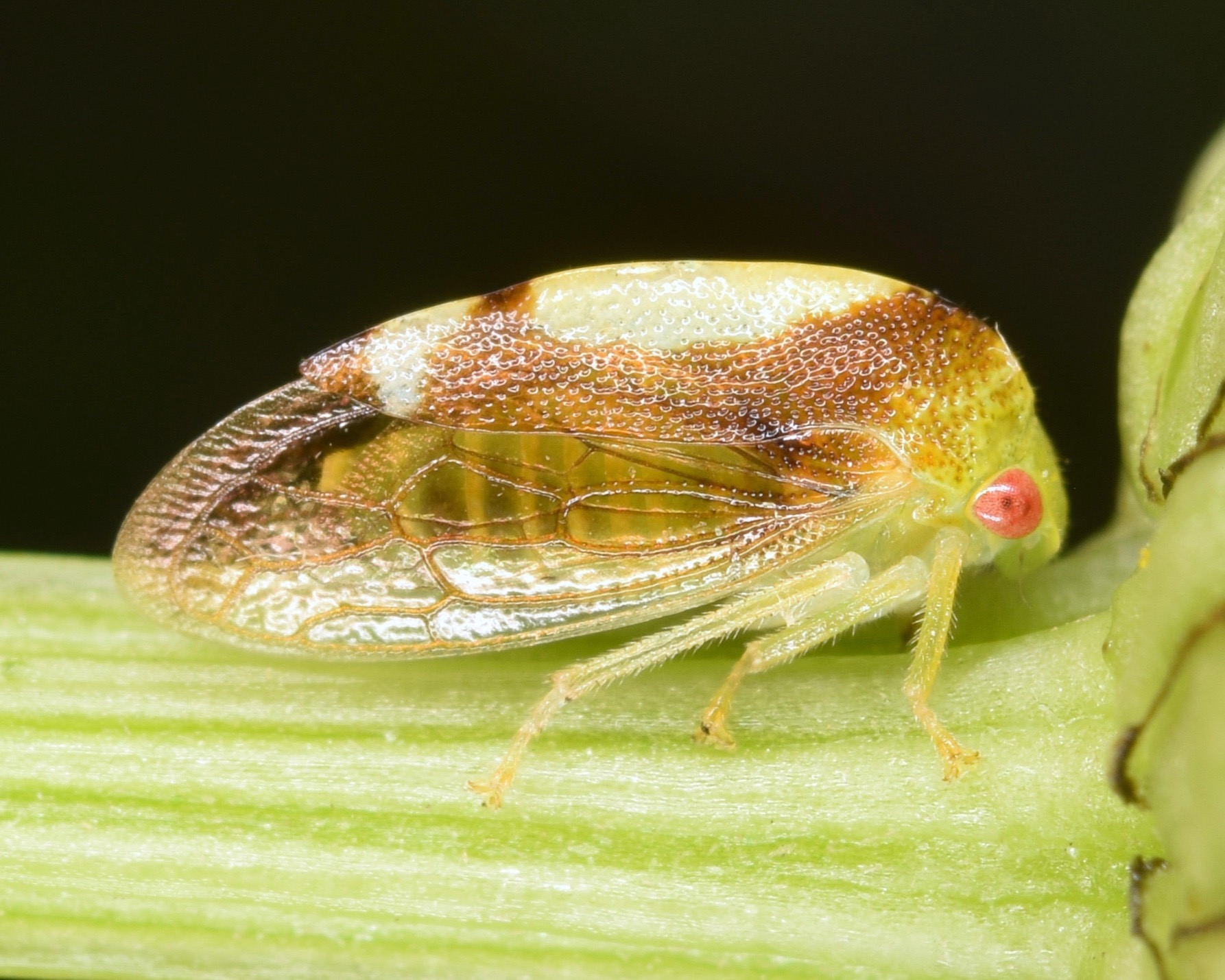
- Atymna querci

Scientific classification
- Kingdom: Animalia
- Phylum: Arthropoda
- Clade: Pancrustacea
- Class: Insecta
- Order: Hemiptera
- Suborder: Auchenorrhyncha
- Family: Membracidae
- Tribe: Smiliini
- Genus: Atymna; Stål, 1867

Synonyms
- Atymia Osborn, 1891

= Atymna =

Genus of insects

Atymna is a genus of treehoppers in the family Membracidae.

== Species ==
- Atymna atromarginata Goding, 1928
- Atymna castaneae (Fitch, 1851)
- Atymna distincta Plummer, 1938
- Atymna gigantea Plummer, 1938
- Atymna helena (Woodruff, 1915)
- Atymna inornata (Say, 1830)
- Atymna pilosa Funkhouser, 1919
- Atymna querci (Fitch, 1851)
- Atymna reticulata Ball, 1937
- Atymna simplex (Van Duzee, 1908)
