= Cyrtolobus distinguendus =

Scientific classification
- Kingdom: Animalia
- Phylum: Arthropoda
- Class: Insecta
- Order: Hemiptera
- Suborder: Auchenorrhyncha
- Family: Membracidae
- Genus: Cyrtolobus
- Species: C. distinguendus

Binomial name
- Cyrtolobus distinguendus Fowler

Species of insect

Cyrtolobus distinguendus is a species of treehopper belonging to the family Membracidae.
