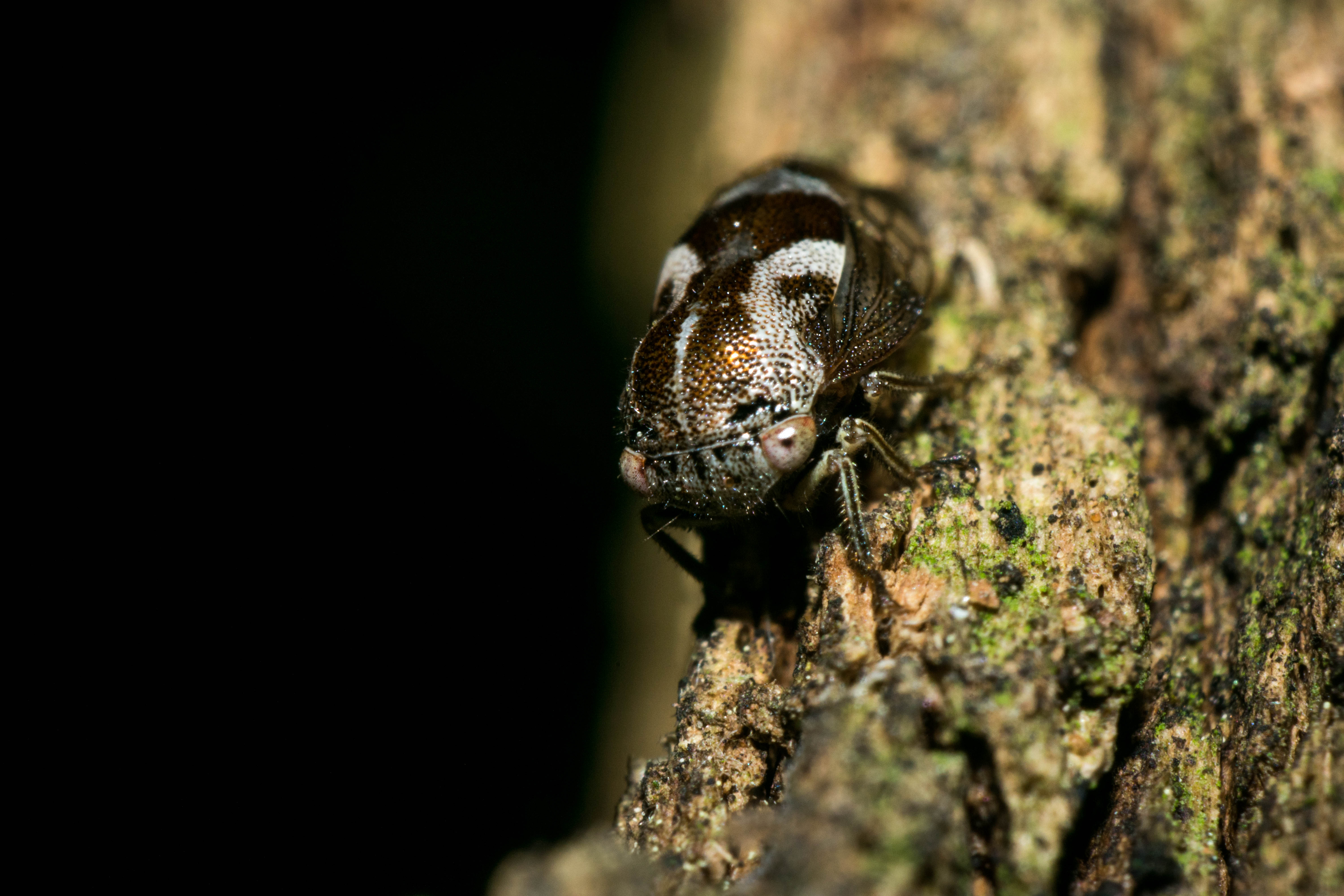

Scientific classification
- Kingdom: Animalia
- Phylum: Arthropoda
- Clade: Pancrustacea
- Class: Insecta
- Order: Hemiptera
- Suborder: Auchenorrhyncha
- Family: Membracidae
- Genus: Ophiderma
- Species: O. definitum

Binomial name
- Ophiderma definitum Woodruff, 1919

= Ophiderma definitum =

Species of true bug

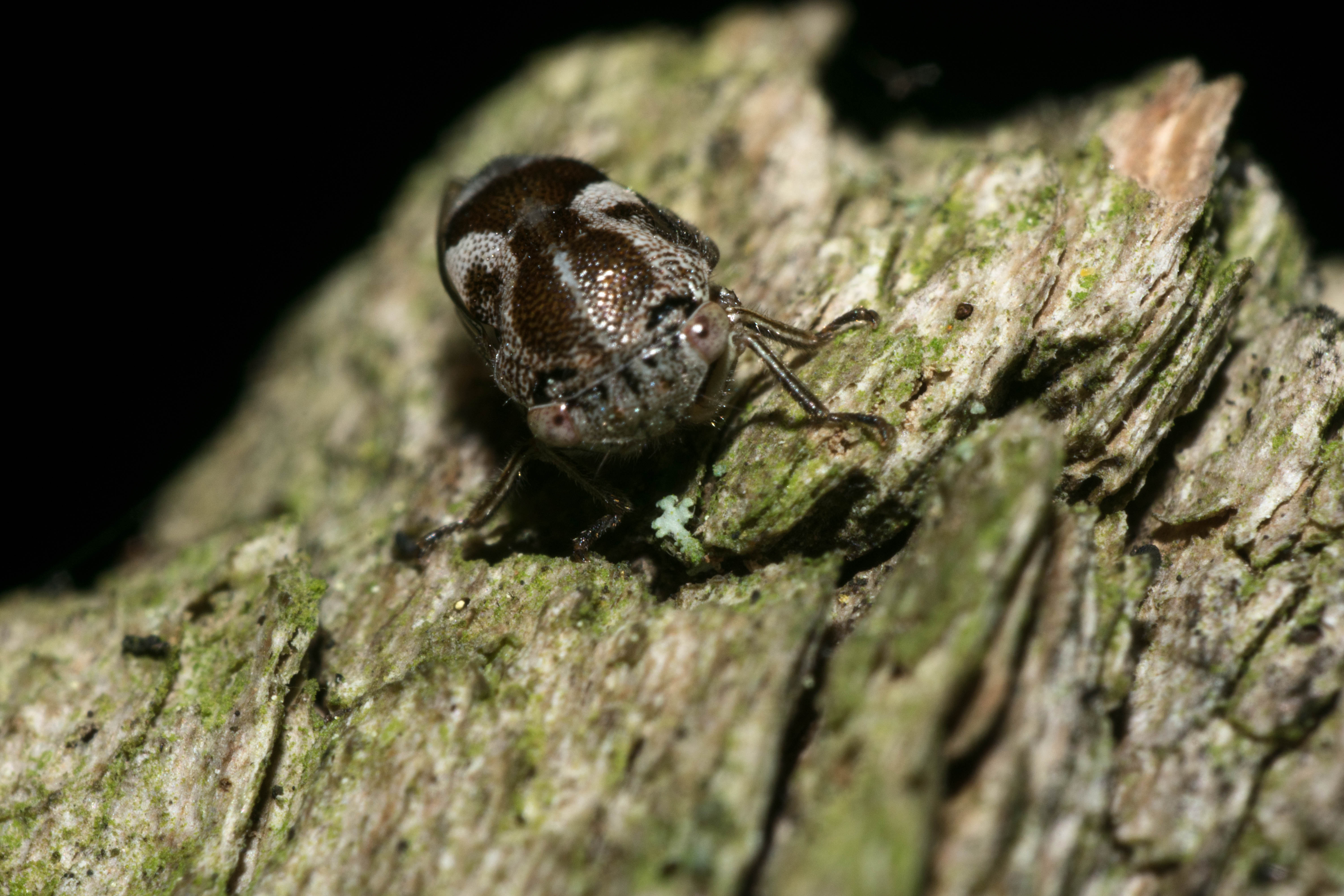
Ophiderma definita

Ophiderma definitum is a species of treehopper in the family Membracidae. They can be found between March and June in the Central and Eastern regions of the United States and Canada.

These insects are quite small, males growing between 5–5.5 mm and females growing between 4–5 mm.

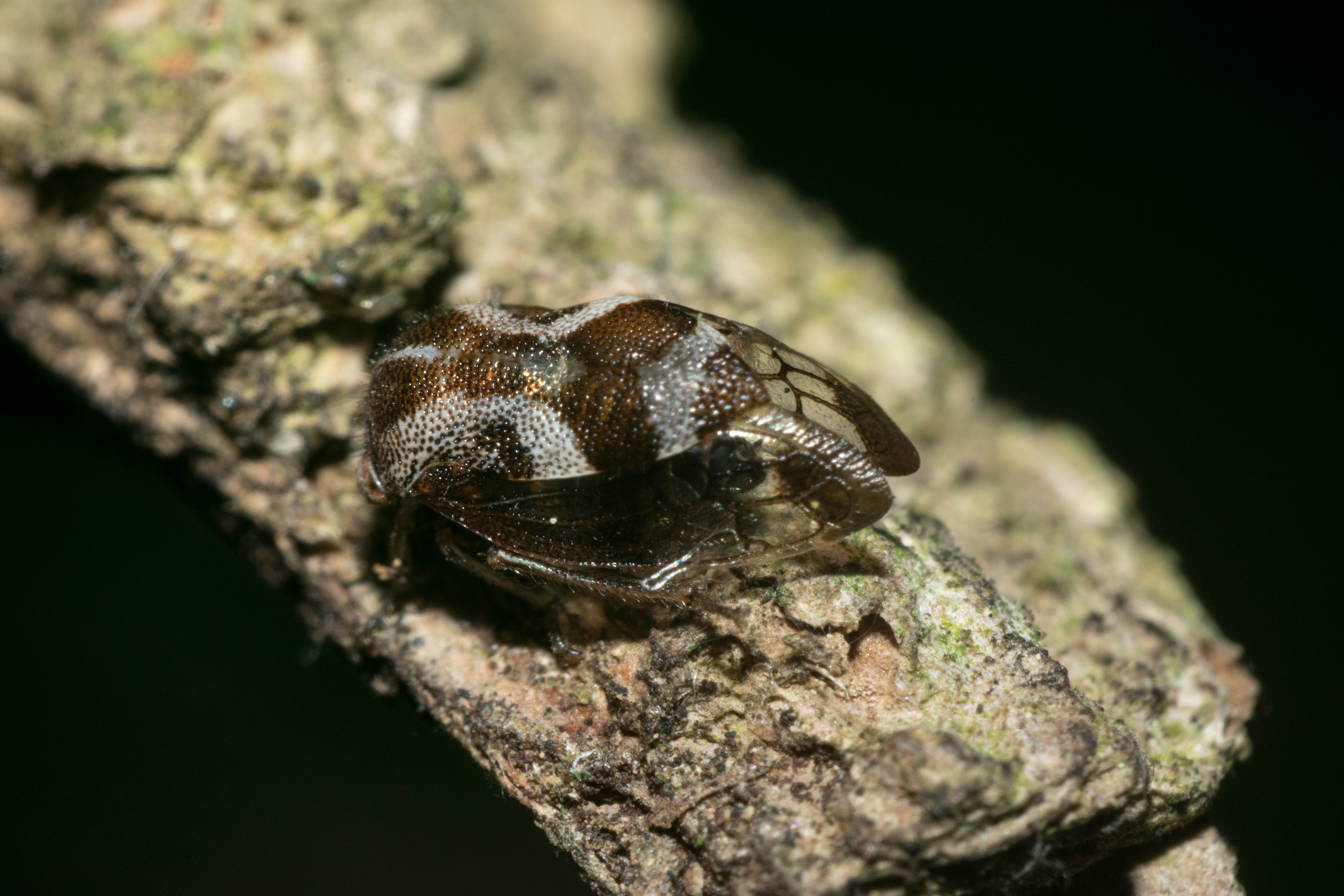
Displaying its wings
