= Cyrtolobus acutus =

Scientific classification
- Domain: Eukaryota
- Kingdom: Animalia
- Phylum: Arthropoda
- Class: Insecta
- Order: Hemiptera
- Suborder: Auchenorrhyncha
- Family: Membracidae
- Genus: Cyrtolobus
- Species: C. acutus

Binomial name
- Cyrtolobus acutus Van Duzee, 1908

Species of insect

Cyrtolobus acutus is a species of treehopper. It was first described by Edward P. Van Duzee in 1908. It is found in the south-western United States.
