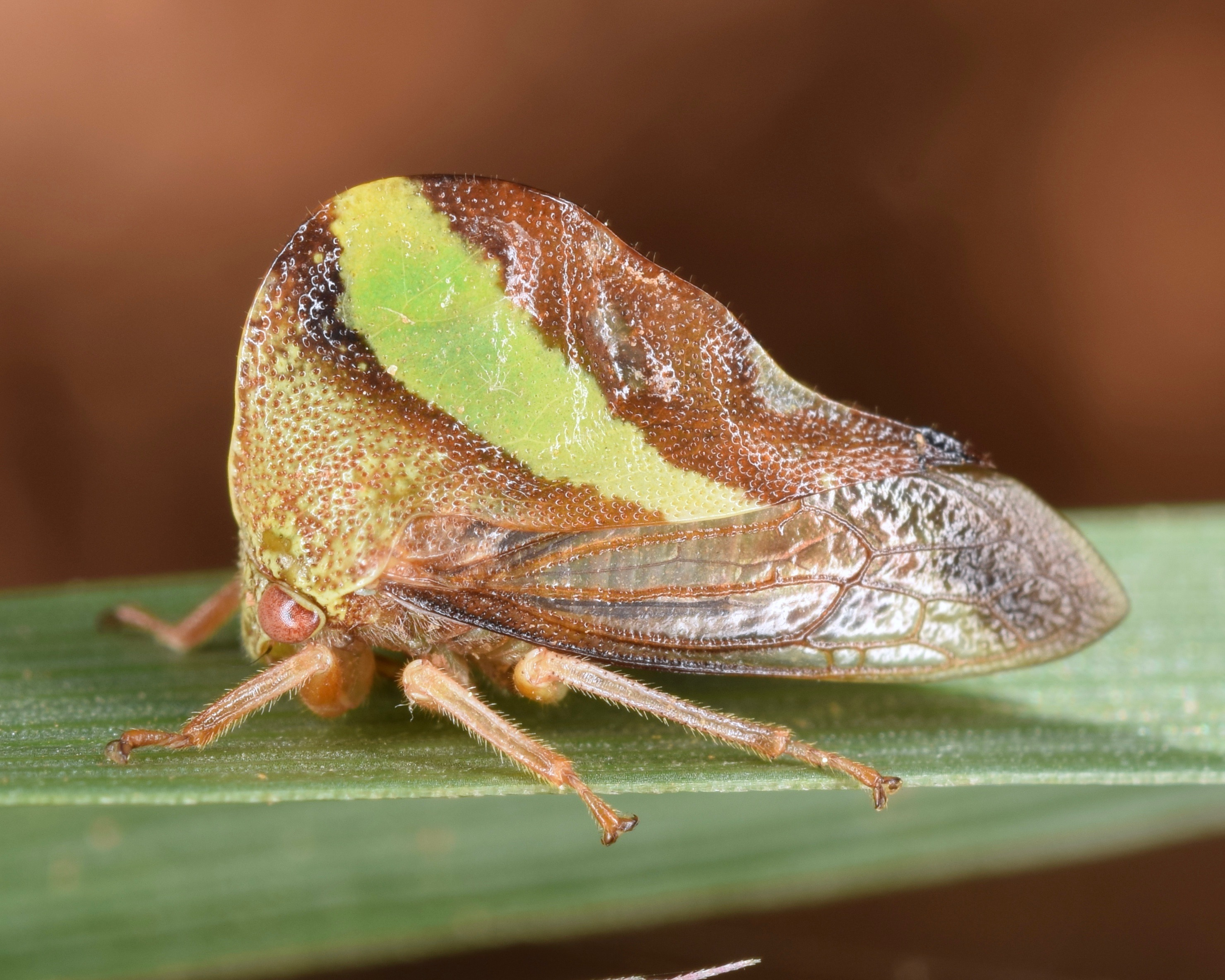
- Smilia camelus (Camel treehopper)

Scientific classification
- Kingdom: Animalia
- Phylum: Arthropoda
- Class: Insecta
- Order: Hemiptera
- Suborder: Auchenorrhyncha
- Family: Membracidae
- Genus: Smilia
- Species: S. camelus

Binomial name
- Smilia camelus Fabricius, 1803

= Smilia camelus =

Species of insect

Smilia camelus, also known as the camel treehopper, is a species of treehopper first described by Johan Christian Fabricius in 1803.

== Habitat ==
S. camelus is distributed across the eastern portion of Canada and the United States. It is commonly found in mixed hardwood forests. It is abundant across the summer months.

== Diet ==
It commonly feeds on southern red oak, turkey oak, water oak, post oak, and other species of the Quercus genus.

== Description ==
Females are around 9 mm (0.35 in) long and males are 8 mm (0.31 in). It has a high pronotum, peaking in the head rather than the middle of the pronotum. The pronotum of the female is higher than the male.
