= List of Texas Wildlife Management Areas =

Texas Wildlife Management

Texas Wildlife Management Areas are divided into seven regions of the Texas Parks and Wildlife Department with the goal of managing and conserving the natural and cultural resources of Texas. There are 714,094 acres (288,984 ha) under management of the Division of Wildlife often referred to as a WMA.

== WMA areas ==
- Area 1: Panhandle/High Plains Wildlife District includes five WMAs
- Area 2: Prairies and Lakes
- Area 3: Pineywoods
- Area 4: Gulf Coast
- Area 5: South Texas Plains
- Area 6: Hill Country
- Area 7: Big Bend Country

There is some confusion as there are also listed eight Wildlife Management Areas that roughly coincide with the 10 ecoregions.

- Trans Pecos
- High Plains/Panhandle
- Cross Timbers
- Hill Country
- Post Oak Savannah
- Pineywoods
- Oak Prairie
- South Texas Plains

== WMA list ==
The following are all designated Wildlife Management Areas (WMAs) in Texas:

Name	County	Size	Description	Region
Alabama Creek Wildlife Management Area (WMA)	Trinity County	14,561 acres	Part of the Davy Crockett National Forest	Area 3
Alazan Bayou WMA	Nacogdoches County	2,063 acres	Purchased in 1991 for bottomland hardwood forest preservation around the Angelina River that includes Loco Bayou and Moral Creek.	Area 3
Angelina-Neches/Dam B WMA	Jasper County and Tyler County	12,636 acres	Located at the fork of the Angelina River, Neches River and the B.A. Steinhagen Reservoir. 7,000 acres are part of the reservoir.	Area 3
Atkinson Island WMA	Harris and Chambers County	150 acres	Located on the southern end of Atkinson Island and acceptable by boat only. The WMA was donated by Conoco, Inc. as a non-game wildlife preserve.	Area 4
Bannister WMA	San Augustine County	25,695 acres	Part of the Angelina National Forest under a memorandum of understanding with the US Forest Service. The WMA is situated on a peninsula extending into Sam Rayburn Reservoir and is designated an eastern wild turkey restoration site.	Area 3
Big Lake Bottom WMA	Anderson County		Purchased 1990	Area 2
Black Gap Wildlife Management Area (WMA)	Brewster County	Approximately 103,000 acres/additional 16,000 acres being added	Located 55 miles south of Marathon Big Bend National Park The Texas Game and Oyster Commission purchased 54,000 acres from the Combs Cattle Company in 1948. Location is 55 miles south of Marathon. Shares 25 miles of the Rio Grande with the Mexican State of Coahuila to the south and where the Serranias del Burro and Sierra del Carmen mountain ranges. Native bighorn sheep (Ovis canadensis mexicana) was almost extirpated but re-introduction efforts have proven successful. Twenty-five square miles (16,000 acres) are being added to the WMA with a 2018 approved purchase plan.	Area 7
Caddo Lake WMA	Marion County and Harrison County	8,005 acres	A state park managed by the U.S. Army Corps of Engineers and operated as a WMA. Large portion purchased in 1992. Chosen as a wetland of international importance, specifically as a waterfowl habitat and protected under the Ramsar Convention. Contains a permanently flooded and largest bald cypress swamp in the world as well as a seasonally flooded bottomland hardwoods.	Area 3
Caddo National Grasslands WMA	Fannin County	17,873 acres	Designated a National Grassland. Operated under two units: Ladonia Unit and the Bois D'Arc Unit.	Area 2
Candy Cain Abshier WMA	Chambers County	207 acres	Purchased in 1990 and located near Smith Point along Galveston and Trinity Bay. A birding center with an observatory, a hawk watchtower.	Area 4
Cedar Creek Islands WMA	Henderson County	160 acres	Three islands in Cedar Creek Reservoir.	Area 2
Chaparral Wildlife Management Area (WMA)	La Salle County and Dimmit County	15,200	Purchased from the Light family in 1969, as a research and demonstration facility, with funds provided by the Pittman–Robertson Act. In 2008 a destructive fire burned over 60,000 acres including ninety-five percent of the WMA. Warthogs, that have escaped exotic game ranches, have established habitat in the WMA in Dimmit and La Salle County. They have also been sighted in McMullen County, Zavala County, and Live Oak County, Texas.	Area 5
Cooper WMA	Delta County, Hopkins County	19,280 acres	Adjacent to Jim Chapman Lake/Cooper Dam	Area 2
D.R. Wintermann WMA	Wharton County	246 acres	A wetlands area was created with water from the Colorado River that attracts migratory birds including bald eagles	Area 4
East Texas Conservation Center			A TPWD Jasper Fish Hatchery that started in 1932.	Area 3
Elephant Mountain WMA	Brewster County	23,147 acres	Located 26 miles south of Alpine the land was donated in 1985. Wildlife includes the desert bighorn-sheep, pronghorn antelope, scaled quail, as well as the whiptail lizards, and spadefoot toads.	Area 7
Gene Howe WMA	Hemphill County	5,886 acres	Using Pittman-Robertson funds the WMA was purchased in 1950 and 1951.	Area 1
Gene Howe WMA - W.A. "Pat" Murphy Unit	Lipscomb County	432 acres	A unit of the Gene Howe WMA that includes 89 acres of creek bottom. The unit is used for instructional, educational, and research purposes.	Area 1
Guadalupe Delta WMA	Calhoun County, Victoria County and Refugio County	7411.34 acres	The WMA has four units: Mission Lake Unit (4,447.62 acres), Hynes Bay Unit (1007.72 acres), Guadalupe River Unit (1138 acres), and the San Antonio Unit (818 acres). State and federally threatened species observed: brown pelican, reddish egret, white-faced ibis, wood stork, bald eagle, white-tailed hawk, peregrine falcon, and whooping crane. Rare/endangered species: diamondback terrapin (Malaclemys terrapin littoralis).	Area 4
Gus Engeling WMA	Anderson County	11,000-acres	21 miles northwest of Palestine. The unit was named for the first biologist assigned to the area who was killed by a poacher just before Christmas in 1951.	Area 2
J.D. Murphree WMA	Jefferson County	24,498 acres	The Big Hill Unit (8,312 acres) was acquired in 1958, the Lost Lake Unit was purchased in 1983, expanded in 1997, and renamed Salt Bayou Unit (15,595 acres). The Hillebrandt Unit (591 acres) was added in 1987. The American alligator is abundant and harvested annually by special drawn permit. Rare/endangered species: piping plover (Charadrius melodus), green sea turtle (Chelonia mydas), hawksbill sea turtle (Eretmochelys imbricate), ridley sea turtle (Lepidochelys kempii), loggerhead sea turtle (Caretta caretta), and the Louisiana black bear (Ursus americanus luteolus).	Area 4
James E. Daughtrey	Live Oak County and McMullen county	34,000 acres	The WMA is named after state game warden James E. Daughtrey, who was fatally injured in a vehicle accident while pursuing suspects in McMullen County.	Area 5
Justin Hurst	Brazoria County	11,938	10,311 acres was purchased from 1985 to 1988. Another 1,627 was added in 1998. The land was originally part of the Peach Point Plantation was owned by James F. Perry and his wife Emily, who purchased it in 1832 from her brother Stephen F. Austin, and it was a slave plantation until 1863. Emily gave her son Bryan and his wife Lavinia 200 acres they called the Durazno Plantation and a part of this became the WMA.	Area 4
Keechi Creek WMA	Leon County	1,500 acres	Purchased in 1986 from a wildlife habitat mitigation obligation of the Brazos River Authority because of the land lost from the construction of the Sterling C. Robertson Dam (Robertson County) on Lake Limestone, Navasota River.	Area 2
Kerr WMA		6,493 acres	The WMA was purchased from the Presbyterian MO Ranch Assembly in 1950 under the Pittman-Robertson Act using Federal Aid for Wildlife Restoration Program funds.	Area 6
Las Palomas WMA, Anacua Unit	Cameron County	222 acres	Used as a dove breeding habitat.	Area 5
Las Palomas WMA, Lower Rio Grande Valley Units	Cameron County, Hidalgo County and Presidio County	3,311 acres	Location is in the Lower Rio Grande Valley.	Area 5
Lower Neches WMA	Orange County near Orange	7,998 acres	The WMA is eight miles southwest of Orange with the Sabine Lake on the east side. The Old River Unit borders the Neches River on the north side and has a wildlife viewing platform.	Area 4
M.O. Neasloney	Gonzales County	100 acres	Used as a wildlife ecology field.	Area 2
Mad Island	Matagorda County	7,200 acres	Purchased in 1987 and located just west of Matagorda	Area 4
Mason Mountain WMA		5,301	A former exotic game ranch acquired through personal donation by the TPWD in 1997. There are species of the scimitar-horned oryx, Gemsbok, common Waterbuck, Greater Kudu, Thomson's Gazelle and the axis deer.	Area 6
Matador WMA	Cottle County	28,183 acres	Purchased in 1959 for the purposes of wildlife research, wildlife management, and public use.	Area 1
Matagorda Island	Calhoun County	56,688 acres	A 38 mile long island that is from one mile to four and one half miles wide. Jointly owned by the Texas General Land Office and the U.S. Fish and Wildlife Service, cooperatively managed as the Matagorda Island National Wildlife Refuge and State Natural Area, by the Texas Parks and Wildlife. The Matagorda Island Light (1852) is still found on the island.	Area 4
Moore Plantation WMA	Sabine County and Jasper County	26,772 acres	The WMA is part of the Sabine National Forest under a cooperative agreement with the US Forest Service (majority land owner), Texas Parks and Wildlife, and the adjacent land owners. The endangered red cockaded woodpecker is present.	Area 3
Muse WMA (McGillivray and Leona McKie Muse WMA)	Brown County	1,972.5 acres	15 miles northeast of Brownwood	
Nannie M. Stringfellow	Brazoria County	3,664 acres	The WMA is located around 5 miles south of Brazoria, 7 miles southeast of Sweeny and northwest of San Bernard National Wildlife Refuge and Justin Hurst Wildlife Management Area.	
Nature Center	Smith County in Tyler	82 acres	Previously a bird hatchery and has a pond stocked with rainbow trout.	Area 3
North Toledo Bend	Shelby adjacent to Toledo Bend Reservoir.	3,650 acres	Managed under a license agreement with the Sabine River Authority of Texas.	Area 3
Old Sabine Bottom	Smith County	5,158 acres	Located five miles northeast of Lindale between the Old Sabine River Channel and the Sabine River.	Area 3
Pat Mayse	Lamar County	8,925 acres	Approximately 11 miles northwest of Paris, just southwest of Chicota wraps around the western side of Pat Mayse Lake. Sanders Creek, Craddock Creek and Sand Branch run through the WMA..	Area 2
Playa Lakes, Armstrong Unit	Castro County	160 acres	Roadside viewing only of migratory waterfowl and shorebirds.	Area 1
Playa Lakes, Dimmitt Unit	Cottle County	422 acres	Purchased in 1990 there are 345 acres of farmland planted with a native grass mixture and a 77-acre playa basin.	Area 1
Playa Lakes, Taylor Lakes Unit	Donley County	530 acres	Purchased in 1993. Located about 60 miles southeast of Amarillo and 50 miles northwest of Childress near the community of Lelia Lake. Note: A playa is a form of geographic sink often referred to as a dry lake in the U.S. The three related WMA playas seasonally have water and then dry by evaporation.	Area 1
Powderhorn Ranch WMA	Calhoun County	15,000 acres	Added in 2018 the ranch was funded largely by the Gulf Environmental Benefit Fund administered by the National Fish and Wildlife Foundation. Around 4,000 acres will be returned to grassland prairie and the remaining land is under a five-year plan to be returned to the State Parks division for a future state park.	
Redhead Pond	Nueces County	20 acres	Located in Flour Bluff. Approximately 10 acres of marsh with a 10-acre pond and observation platform. Also known as Redhead Pond #066.	Area 4
Richland Creek Wildlife Management Area	Anderson County		Cyauga is about halfway between the WMA and Gus Engeling WMA. The WMA is divided into the north unit and south unit. Severe flooding in December 2015 caused major damage to levees and to all six pumps supplying water from the Trinity River for three months.	Area 2
Sam Houston National Forest WMA	Montgomery County, San Jacinto County, and Walker County.	161,508 acres	47,609 are located in Montgomery County, 59,746 acres in San Jacinto County, and 54,153 acres in Walker County. Operated under a memorandum of agreement with the US Forest Service.	Area 3
Sierra Diablo WMA	Hudspeth County and Culberson County	11,625 acres	Acquired in 1945 as a sanctuary for the last remaining desert bighorn sheep in Texas.	Area 7
Tawakoni WMA	Hunt County and Van Zandt County	2335 acres	1,561 acres are owned by Sabine River Authority of Texas, the WMA Pawnee Inlet Unit (north of the lake) has 1,381 acres, the Caddo Creek Unit (east of the lake) has 162 acres (Hunt County), the Duck Cove Unit (south of the lake) has 792 acres, with a small portion in Hunt County and the remaining land in Van Zandt County	Area 2
Tony Houseman WMA	Orange County		Located at the Texas travel center from I-10, on the west side of the Sabine River. There is a 600 ft boardwalk leading from the travel center building into the swamp for wildlife viewing.	Area 4
Welder Flats WMA	Calhoun County	1480 acres	Owned by the General Land Office. Viewing of the endangered whooping crane.	Area 4
White Oak Creek WMA	Bowie County, Cass County, Morris County and Titus County.	25,777 acres	Mostly centered around the confluence of the Sulphur River and White Oak Creek. Managed under license agreement with the US Army Corps of Engineers.	Area 3
Yoakum Dunes WMA	Cochran County, Terry County and Yoakum County.	14,037 acres	Located near Lubbock. A primary goal for the WMA is the recovery and preservation of the threatened lesser prairie chicken.	Area 1
