= Alabama, Texas =

Alabama, Texas may refer to:

- Alabama, Houston County, Texas
- Alabama, Trinity County, Texas
