= F35 (disambiguation) =

The F-35 is the Lockheed Martin F-35 Lightning II, an American stealth fighter aircraft.

F35 or F-35 may also refer to:

== Places ==
- Possum Kingdom Airport (FAA code: F35), Texas, US
- Route F35 (Iceland), a highland road in Iceland

== Military ==
- Saab 35 Draken (introduced 1955), an export variant of the Saab 35 Draken aircraft, the Saab F-35
- Shenyang J-35 (Chinese: 歼-35, romanized: J-35, lit. 'F-35'), Chinese naval stealth fighter
- INS Udaygiri (F35), a Nilgiri-class frigate of the Indian Navy
- BNS Bijoy (F35), a Castle-class corvette of the Bangladeshi Navy
- HMS Rajputana (F35), a British World War II merchant cruiser

== Automotive ==
- DR F35, an Italian compact crossover car from DR Automobiles
- F35 transmission (introduced 1984), a Saab-designed five-speed manual transaxle
- BMW 3 Series (F35) (introduced 2012), a long wheelbase version of the BMW 3 Series (F30)
- Life F35, a W12 Formula One engine

== Other uses ==
- F35 (classification), classification at the Paralympic Games for club, discus throw, shot put and javelin
