= Clymer Meadow Preserve =

Nature preserve in Texas

- Clymer Meadow, Hunt County, TX (24 June 2021)

- Location within the United States
- Location: Hunt County, Texas
- Nearest city: Greenville, Texas
- Coordinates: 33°18′38″N 96°14′34″W
- Area: 1,068 acres (432 ha)

Clymer Meadow Preserve is a Nature Conservancy preserve located in the Blackland Prairie region of north Texas. As of 2021 the area covers about 1400 acres but with the occasional acquisition of new land the preserve slowly continues to expand.

== Habitats ==
The Clymer Meadow Preserve protects one of the largest remaining areas of tallgrass prairie in Texas including two globally imperilled plant communities: Little Bluestem-Indiangrass and Gamagrass-Switchgrass community series types.
