= Alabama, Trinity County, Texas =

Unincorporated community in Texas, US

Alabama
- Unincorporated community
- Location within Texas
- Coordinates: 31.13504200°N 94.87202700°W
- Country: United States
- State: Texas
- County: Trinity
- Named for: Alabama people

Alabama is an unincorporated community in Trinity County, Texas, United States. Situated on Farm to Market Road 357 and the Alabama Creek Wildlife Management Area, it was settled c. 1865, and named for the Alabama people. By 1990, the population was 20.
