= Possum Kingdom Airport =

Public airport in Graford, Texas, United States

- IATA: none; ICAO: none; FAA LID: F35

Summary
- Airport type: Public
- Owner: Brazos River Authority
- Serves: Graford, Texas
- Elevation AMSL: 1,008.3 ft (307.3 m)
- Coordinates: 32°55′24″N 098°26′13″W
- Website: Possum Kingdom Airport at Brazos River Authority

Map
- Location within Texas

Runways
Direction	Length		Surface
Direction	ft	m	Surface
02/20	3,500	1,067	Asphalt

Statistics (2017)
- Aircraft operations: 1,400
- Based aircraft: 22
- Sources: Federal Aviation Administration except as noted

Possum Kingdom Airport (FAA LID: F35) is a public airport in Graford, Palo Pinto County, Texas, United States, located 12 nautical miles (22 km) west of the central business district. The airport has no IATA or ICAO designation. The airport is owned and operated by the Brazos River Authority and is located on the east side of Possum Kingdom Lake.

The airport is used solely for general aviation purposes.

== Facilities ==
Possum Kingdom Airport covers 59 acres (24 ha) at an elevation of 1,008.3 feet (307.3 m) above mean sea level (AMSL), and has one runway:

- Runway 02/20: 3,500 x 60 ft. (1,067 x 18 m), Surface: Asphalt

For the 12-month period ending 31 December 2015, the airport had 1,400 aircraft operations, an average of 4 per day: 100% general aviation. At that time there were 22 aircraft based at this airport: 91% single-engine and 9% helicopters, with no multi-engine, jets, ultralights, or gliders.

== Accidents and incidents ==
- 21 July 1985: A Piper PA-38 Tomahawk, registration number N2323E, was destroyed in a hard landing; the pilot and single passenger suffered minor injuries. Unable to find his intended destination airport, the pilot diverted to Possum Kingdom Airport, but ran out of fuel while descending to land and was too high and fast on final approach. He purposely touched down beside the runway to avoid a runway overrun, but landed hard, causing the landing gear to collapse and the aircraft to flip over. The accident was attributed to fuel exhaustion and the pilot's failure to maintain a proper descent rate. Contributing factors were an inoperative beacon at the intended destination and soft terrain at the landing site.

== See also ==
- List of airports in Texas
