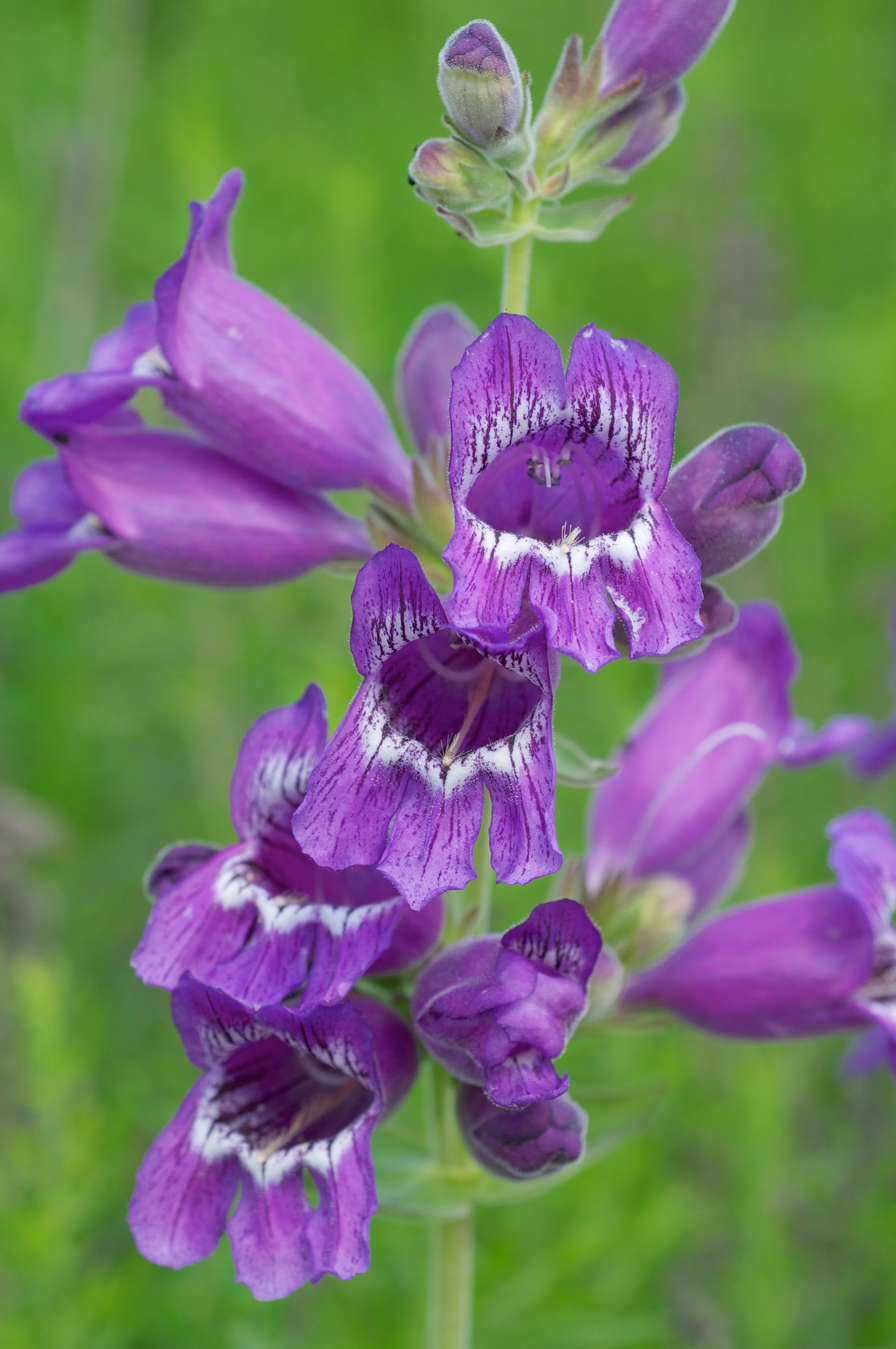

Conservation status
- Apparently Secure (NatureServe)

Scientific classification
- Kingdom: Plantae
- Clade: Tracheophytes
- Clade: Angiosperms
- Clade: Eudicots
- Clade: Asterids
- Order: Lamiales
- Family: Plantaginaceae
- Genus: Penstemon
- Species: P. cobaea

Binomial name
- Penstemon cobaea Nutt.

Varieties
- P. cobaea var. cobaea; P. cobaea var. purpureus Pennell

Synonyms
- List: Penstemon cobaea subsp. typicus Pennell; Penstemon grandiflorus F.Dietr.

= Penstemon cobaea =

Plant species in the plantain family

Penstemon cobaea is a flowering plant in the plantain family, commonly known as Cobaea beardtongue, prairie penstemon or foxglove penstemon. The plant is native to the central United States, primarily the Great Plains from Nebraska to Texas, with additional populations in the Ozarks of Missouri and Arkansas. There are also populations reported in the southwestern United States as well as in Illinois and Ohio, but these appear to be introductions.

== Description ==
Penstemon cobaea is usually between 25 and 65 centimeters (10 and 26 in) tall, but on occasion may be as short as 15 cm (6 in) or as tall as 100 cm (3.3 ft). The stems grow directly upwards or curve backwards before growing upwards. The lower portion of the stems are puberulent, covered in very small and fine hairs, while further up they are glandular-pubescent, covered in glandular hairs.

Plants will have both cauline and basal leaves, those attached to the stems and ones that grow directly from the base of the plant. However, sometimes the basal leaves will be absent or wither by the time of flowering. The leaves are dark green and quite large. The basal leaves and the lowest cauline will measure 3.5 to 15 centimeters long, though usually shorter than 12 cm, and 0.8 to 7.6 cm wide, though usually narrower than 5.5 cm. They may be spatulate to oblanceolate or elliptic in shape with a tapering base and edges that are almost entirely smooth, have forwards facing asymmetrical teeth, or regular teeth. Each stem will have four to eight pairs of leaves attached to opposite sides. While the lower leaves have petioles while the upper leaves have bases directly attached to the stems.

Of the penstemon species that grow in the United States Cobaea penstemon has the largest flowers. The inflorescence will usually have three to six groups of flowers, though occasionally as many as eight. Each of the paired cymes in a group will have between two and six flowers. Each flower measures 3.5 to 5.5 centimeters (1.5 to 2 in) long. They have five lobes, with two large lobes on top and three small lobes on the bottom. The flowers have a structure reminiscent of a ribcage inside, and can be colored white to dark pink with magenta lines. Blooming will start as early as April and can occur as late as May in the southern part of its range, while in the north it could be early as early as May late as June.

== Taxonomy ==
The scientific description and name of Penstemon cobaea was published in 1835 by the botanist Thomas Nuttall based on a lecture he presented 5 April 1834 about plants in the Territory of Arkansas. It was given the illegitimate name of Penstemon grandiflorus by Friedrich Gottlieb Dietrich in 1837, having already been correctly described and because Nuttall had already used it for another species in 1813. P. cobaea has two accepted varieties.

=== Names ===
The species name, cobea, was selected to honor the Spanish missionary and naturalist Father Bernabé Cobo. In English it is known by several common names. A variant of its scientific name is Cobaea penstemon. Related to its habitat it is called prairie penstemon. For the species appearance it may be called foxglove penstemon or wild white snapdragon.

== Range and habitat ==
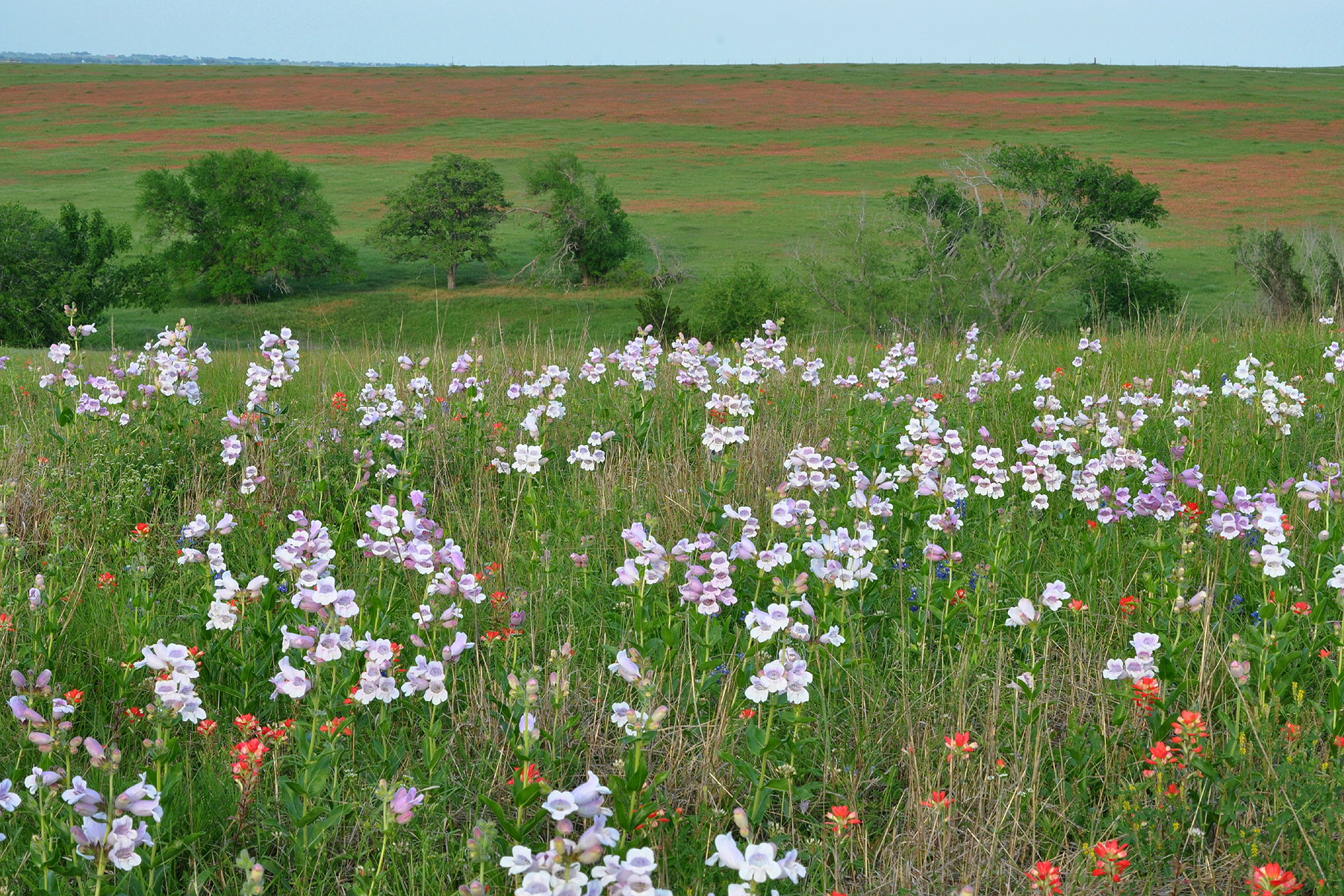
Foxglove penstemon (Penstemon cobaea) on ranchland in the Texas Blackland Prairie eco-region. County Road 269, Lavaca County, Texas

Cobaea beardtongue is native to the plains of the United States from Texas north to Nebraska and east to Arkansas and Iowa. In Texas it is mainly grows in the central part of the state from Victoria northwards to Oklahoma. There it grows in the larger eastern side of the state and is unknown in the Oklahoma panhandle. It also grows in the eastern two-thirds of Kansas, but only in the far south eastern corner of Nebraska. Most of its range in Missouri is in the south bordering the main population in Arkansas. The exact location in Iowa is not recorded.

It also grows in Colorado, New Mexico, Arizona, Illinois, and Ohio, but is listed as an introduced species there by Plants of the World Online.

Penstemon cobaea grows on hillsides, gravel, rocky outcrops, and gypsum soils, and eroded pastures.

=== Conservation ===
The conservation organization NatureServe evaluated Penstemon cobaea as apparently secure (G4) in 1987. At the state level they also rated it as apparently secure (S4) in Oklahoma, but vulnerable (S3) in Arkansas and Nebraska. Though other organizations show it as introduced to Colorado, NatureServe lists it as critically imperiled (S1) there alongside Iowa. They have not rated the rest of the range.

== Cultivation ==
The flowers of Penstemon cobaea will eventually become brown and black capsules, which contain the seeds. After planting, the seeds will take about two years to flower. It is good to leave 40 to 50 cm (16 to 20 in) between plants when gardening, and lime is often needed in the soil.

== See also ==
- List of Penstemon species
