= Alabama, Houston County, Texas =

Ghost town in Texas, US

- Ghost town
- Location within Texas
- Coordinates: 31.23212640°N 95.72578490°W
- Country: United States
- State: Texas
- County: Houston

Alabama is a ghost town in Houston County, Texas, United States. Established in the 1830s, on a steamboat stop on the Trinity River, the Trinity College was commissioned by Texas Congress in 1841, operating before the American Civil War. A post office operated from 1846 to 1878. The community began to decline in the 1870s, when railroads were built. It was abandoned by 1946.
