= Lake Limestone =

Reservoir in Texas, United States

- Location within Texas Location within the United States
- Location: Limestone / Leon / Robertson counties, Texas, US
- Coordinates: 31°19′31″N 96°19′03″W
- Basin countries: United States
- Surface area: 13,680 acres (55.4 km^{2})
- Max. depth: 42 ft (13 m)
- Surface elevation: 351 ft (107 m)

Lake Limestone is a 13,680 acres (55.4 km^{2}) reservoir near Thornton, Texas . It lies 15 miles (24 km) southeast of Groesbeck, Texas on Texas FM 3371 in Leon, Robertson and Limestone Counties.

The lake's water is slightly alkaline, moderately clear, with a maximum of 42 feet (13 m) deep. The shoreline is irregular, and fish habitat is provided by brush, timber and aquatic plants.

The controlling authority for the reservoir and the Sterling C. Robertson Dam is the Brazos River Authority.

Lake Limestone has extensive recreational facilities including fishing, motor boating, jet skiing, and swimming.

== General source ==
- Water data for Texas: Lake Limestone
