= Brazos River Authority =

State agency of Texas

- Abbreviation: BRA
- Formation: 1929
- Type: Government-owned corporation
- Purpose: Water conservation and reclamation
- Headquarters: 4600 Cobbs Drive, Waco, Texas, 76714
- Region served: Brazos River basin
- General Manager: David Collinsworth
- Main organ: Board of Directors
- Website: http://www.brazos.org/

The Brazos River Authority or BRA was created in 1929 by the Texas Legislature as a quasi-governmental entity to manage the Brazos River as a water resource in Texas. It was originally named the Brazos River Conservation and Reclamation District and renamed to the current name in 1953. The central office is located at 4600 Cobbs Drive in Waco.

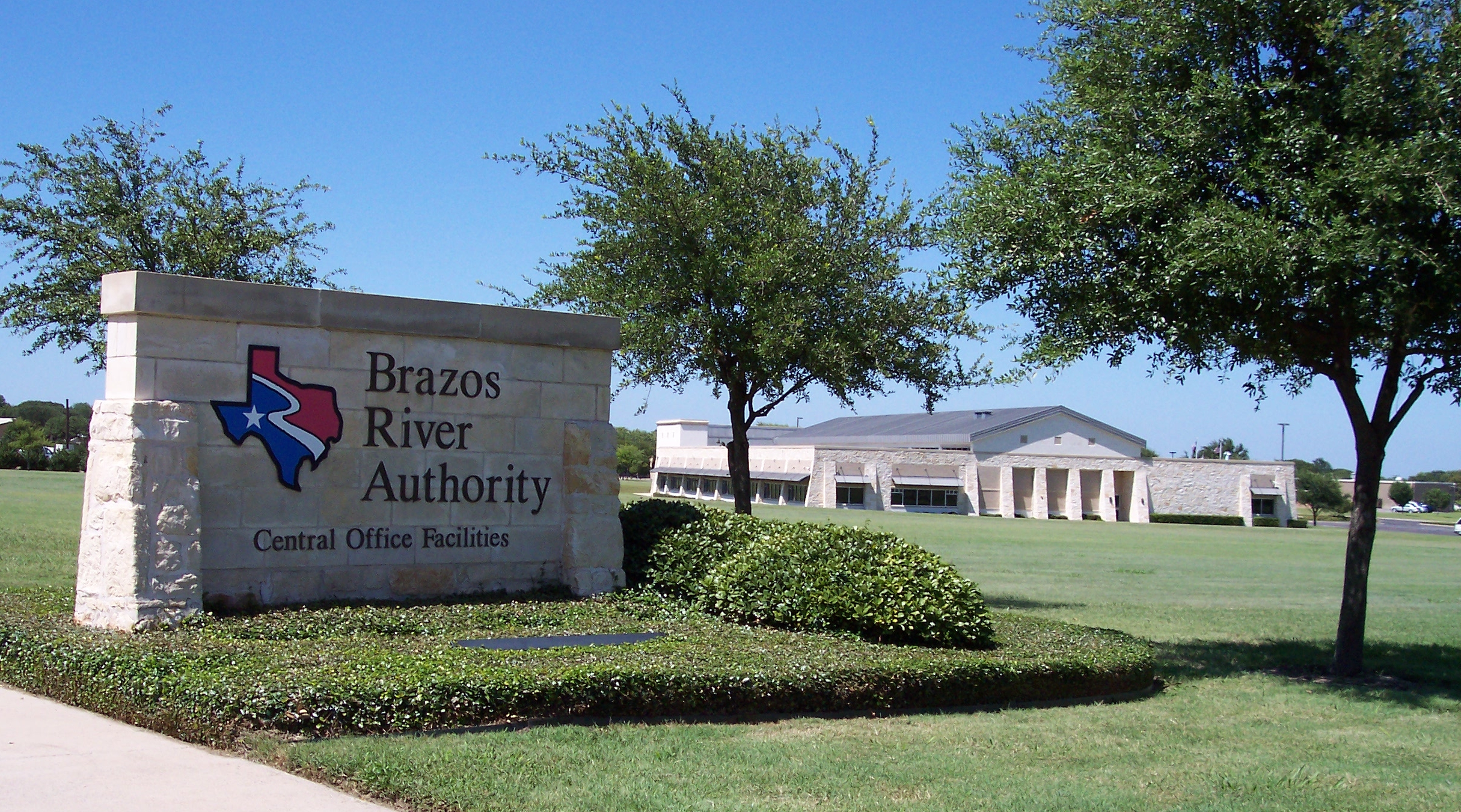

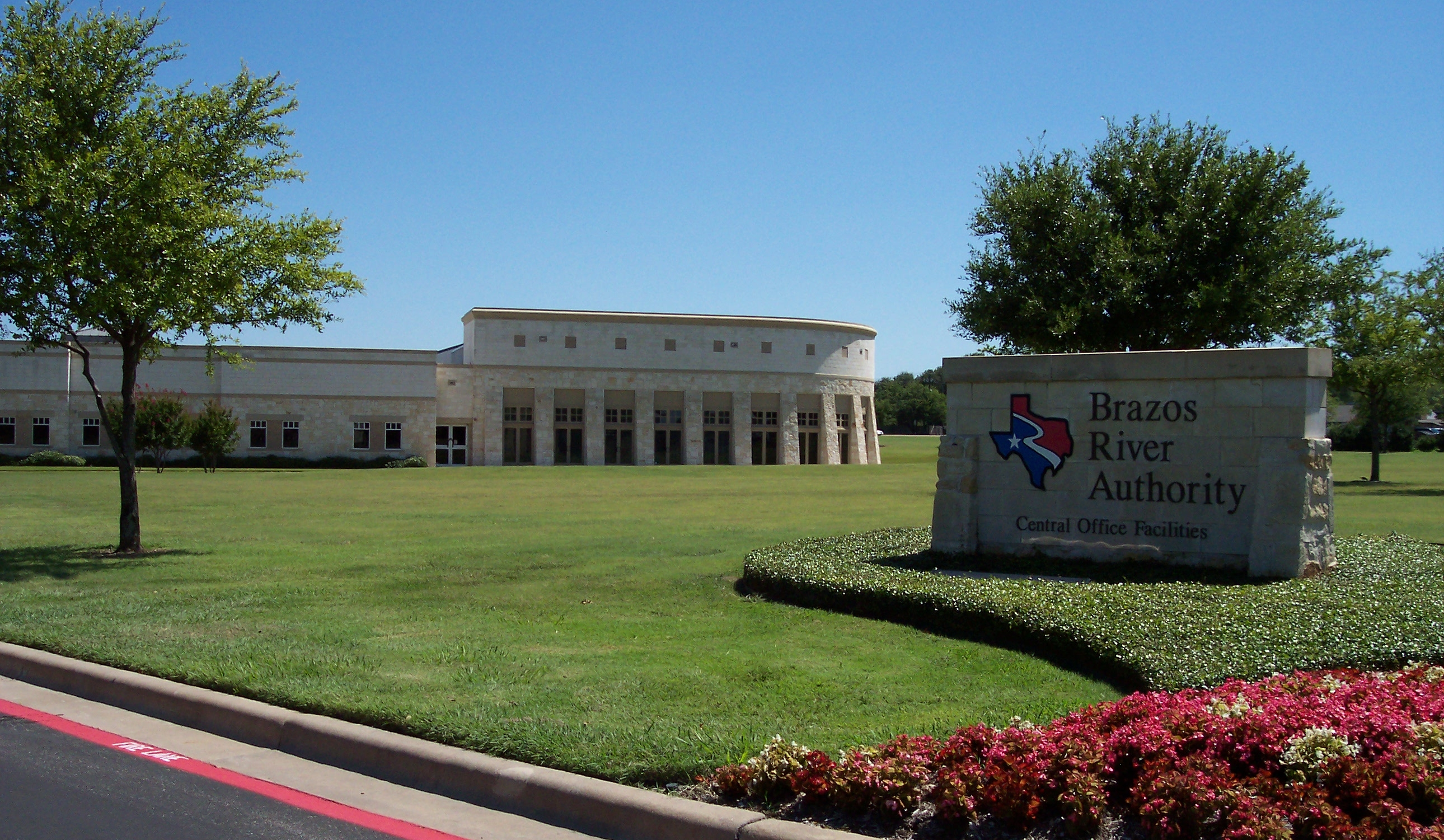
The Brazos River Authority's administration office building in Waco, Texas

== Reservoirs ==
The Brazos River Authority manages dams that create three reservoirs on the Brazos River and its tributaries:

- Lake Granbury on the Brazos River
- Lake Limestone on the Navasota River
- Possum Kingdom Lake on the Brazos River

The Authority will also manage the dam that will create Allens Creek Reservoir on Allens Creek, in the event it is ever built.

== See also ==
- List of Texas river authorities
- Brazos River Authority dams
