= Alabama Creek Wildlife Management Area =

Protected area in Texas, United States

- Location within Texas
- Location: Trinity and Houston counties, Texas, United States
- Nearest city: Diboll, Texas
- Coordinates: 31.1835°N 94.875°W
- Area: 14,561 acres (58.93 km^{2})
- Elevation: 177 feet (54 m)
- Governing body: U.S. Forest Service
- Website: Alabama Creek Wildlife Management Area

Alabama Creek Wildlife Management Area (Alabama Creek WMA) is a 14,561 acre (5,893 ha) protected area in the state of Texas. The WMA is part of the Davy Crockett National Forest operating under a Memorandum of Agreement with the US Forest Service and overseen by the Texas Parks and Wildlife Department.

== History ==
The WMA was established to provide hunting opportunities and maintain population levels of certain game species. There are primitive camping areas but no water supply, restrooms, nor provisions for handicapped people.
