= Cedar Hill School =

Cedar Hill School may refer to:

- Cedar Hill School, Bernards Township, New Jersey, an elementary school in Bernards Township, New Jersey, USA
- Cedar Hill Collegiate High School, an early college high school in Cedar Hill, Texas, USA
- Cedar Hill High School, a public high school in Cedar Hill, Texas, USA
- Cedar Hill Prep School, a private school in Somerset, New Jersey, USA

== See also ==
- Cedar Hill Independent School District
- Cedar Hill (disambiguation)
- Northwest High School (Cedar Hill, Missouri)
- Trinity Christian School – Cedar Hill
