= Dallas College Cedar Valley =

Community college in Lancaster, Texas, U.S.

Coordinates: 32°37′32.13″N 96°45′49.88″W

Dallas College Cedar Valley Campus
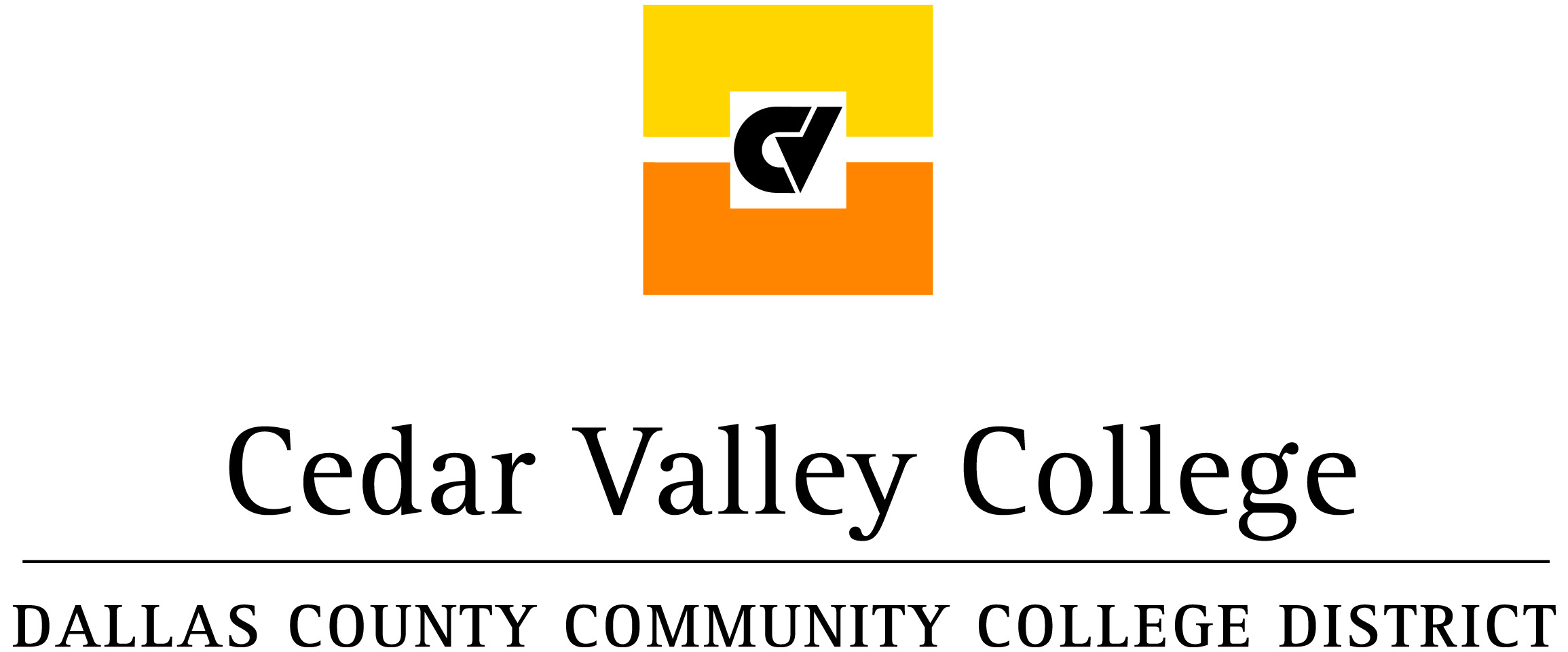
- Type: Public community college
- Established: 1977
- Parent institution: Dallas College
- Chancellor: Justin H. Lonon
- President: Joseph Seabrooks
- Location: Lancaster, Texas, United States
- Colors: Orange, Yellow
- Mascot: The Suns
- Website: www.dallascollege.edu

Dallas College Cedar Valley Campus (Cedar Valley or CVC) is a public community college in Lancaster, Texas. It opened in 1977 and has an enrollment of more than 6,000 students. It is part of Dallas College.

Beginning in the spring of 2004, Cedar Valley College began operating the Cedar Valley College Center at Cedar Hill. The extension center, located in Cedar Hill, Texas, will assist the district's continuing education program featuring classes on computer software, dance, English as a second language, health and wellness, writing résumés and CPA accreditation.

For the 2008-09 school year, Cedar Valley began a joint dual credit enrollment project with the Dallas Independent School District and the Cedar Hill Independent School District by opening two early college high school campuses, one in Dallas and one in Cedar Hill.

The new Dallas school is named Early College High School and provides the opportunity for its graduates to accomplish a high-school diploma and 60 hours of college credit concurrently. Like most early college high school programs, the school was designed to attract students who do not typically enroll in traditional dual-credit programs, such students whose parents did not attend college and those that might feel a college education is not financially possible.

The new Cedar Hill school is named Cedar Hill Collegiate High School, and attracts students who are seeking 60 college credit hours upon graduating from high school. The school is open to students of all backgrounds; however, the staff worked particularly hard to recruit black and Latino males, who are the least likely to earn college degrees.

Dallas College Cedar Valley Campus also hosts the Distance Education Veterinary Technology Program.

== Service area ==
Dallas College Cedar Valley Campus serves a roughly 75-square-mile (190 km^{2}) area of southern Dallas County, including the suburbs of Cedar Hill, DeSoto, Duncanville, Glenn Heights, Hutchins, Lancaster, Seagoville, and Wilmer as well as the Dallas neighborhoods of Highland Hills (zip code 75241), Pleasant Grove (75217), and Red Bird (75232 and 75237).
