= Cedar Hill =

Cedar Hill may refer to:

== Canada ==
- Cedar Hill, a previous name of Mount Douglas, Saanich, Greater Victoria, British Columbia
- Cedarhill Estate, Nepean, Ottawa, Ontario

== United States ==
=== Populated places ===
- Cedar Hill (New Haven), Connecticut, a neighborhood
- Saint Benedict, Louisiana (also Cedar Hill), an unincorporated community
- Cedar Hill, Missouri
- Cedar Hill, New Mexico
- Cedar Hill, North Carolina, an unincorporated community
- Cedar Hill, Ohio, an unincorporated community
- Cedar Hill, Tennessee
- Cedar Hill, Texas
- Cedar Hill, Frederick County, Virginia, an unincorporated community
- Cedar Hill, Virginia (Pittsylvania County), an unincorporated community

=== Other ===
- Cedar Hill (Barstow, Maryland), a house listed on the NRHP
- Cedar Hill (Westover, Maryland), a house listed on the NRHP
- Cedar Hill (Central Park), a hill in Central Park, New York City
- Cedar Hill (Warwick, Rhode Island), a historic summer estate
- Cedar Hill (Buena Vista, Virginia), a house and farm listed on the NRHP
- Cedar Hill, Anacostia, Washington, D.C., now known as Frederick Douglass National Historic Site
- Cedar Hill Yard, a railroad yard in the Cedar Hill neighborhood of New Haven, Connecticut

== See also ==
- Cedar Hill Cemetery (disambiguation)
- Cedar Hill School (disambiguation)
- Cedar Hills (disambiguation)
