= Lake Ridge, Dallas County, Texas =

Master planned development in Dallas' southwest suburbs

Lake Ridge
- Master planned development
- Location within Texas
- Coordinates: 32°34′52″N 97°0′15″W
- Country: United States of America
- State: Texas
- County: Dallas County
- City: Dallas
- Time zone: UTC-6:00 (CST)
  - Summer (DST): UTC-5:00 (CDT)
- Website: www.lakeridge.net

Lake Ridge is a lake-view, master planned development in Dallas' southwest suburbs near Joe Pool Lake. Lake Ridge is located in the cities of Cedar Hill and Grand Prairie. Most of the homes in Lake Ridge are custom built and are on large lots which are often wooded and sit on a hill. Lake Ridge is divided into non-gated neighborhoods and seven individual gated neighborhoods: The Views, The Bluffs, The Fountains, The Hills, The Sanctuary, The Timbers and The Summit. It currently has over 1,000 homes.

== Education ==
Lake Ridge is within the Cedar Hill ISD. Part of Lake Ridge is within the Midlothian ISD.
