= Cedar Hill Cemetery =

Cedar Hill Cemetery may refer to:

- Cedar Hill Cemetery, Governor Ritchie Highway, Brooklyn Park, Maryland
- Cedar Hill Cemetery (Hartford, Connecticut), in Hartford, Newington, and Wethersfield, Connecticut, listed on the NRHP in Connecticut
- Cedar Hill Cemetery (Maryland), in Suitland, Maryland
- Cedar Hill Cemetery (Vicksburg, Mississippi)
- Cedar Hill Cemetery Buildings, Newark, Ohio, listed on the NRHP in Licking County, Ohio
- Cedar Hill Cemetery (Philadelphia, Pennsylvania), a historic cemetery in the Frankford neighborhood of Philadelphia, Pennsylvania
- Cedar Hill Church and Cemeteries, Lexington, Virginia, listed on the NRHP in Rockbridge County, Virginia
- Cedar Hill Cemetery (Suffolk, Virginia), listed on the NRHP in Suffolk, Virginia

== See also ==
- Cedar Hill (disambiguation)
