= Josh Allen (offensive lineman) =

American gridiron football player (born 1991)

No. 61, 65, 66
- Position: Center

Personal information
- Born: December 30, 1991 (age 34); Dallas, Texas, U.S.
- Listed height: 6 ft 3 in (1.91 m)
- Listed weight: 314 lb (142 kg)

Career information
- High school: Cedar Hill (Cedar Hill, Texas)
- College: Louisiana–Monroe (2010–2013)
- NFL draft: 2014: undrafted

Career history
- Tampa Bay Buccaneers (2014)*; Green Bay Packers (2014)*; Tampa Bay Buccaneers (2014–2016); San Francisco 49ers (2016); Tampa Bay Buccaneers (2016–2017)*; Calgary Stampeders (2017)*; Arizona Cardinals (2018)*; Arizona Hotshots (2019); Dallas Renegades (2020)
- * Offseason or practice squad member only

Career NFL statistics
- Games played: 3
- Stats at Pro Football Reference

Josh Nathanial Allen (born December 30, 1991) is an American former professional football player who was a center in the National Football League (NFL). He played college football for the Louisiana–Monroe Warhawks. He was also a member of the Tampa Bay Buccaneers, Green Bay Packers, San Francisco 49ers, Calgary Stampeders, Arizona Cardinals, Arizona Hotshots, and Dallas Renegades.

== Early life ==
Allen played high school football at Cedar Hill High School in Cedar Hill, Texas. He earned first-team all-district honors in 2009 and was selected to play in the Team USA vs. World All-Star Game. He helped lead the Longhorns to the 2008 and 2009 district championships. Allen played tackle and center his senior year. He also lettered in powerlifting and track & field.

== College career ==
Allen played for the Warhawks at the University of Louisiana at Monroe from 2010 to 2013.

== Professional career ==
Pre-draft measurables
Height	Weight	Arm length	Hand span	Wingspan	40-yard dash	10-yard split	20-yard split	20-yard shuttle	Three-cone drill	Vertical jump	Broad jump	Bench press
6 ft 2 7/8 in (1.90 m)	312 lb (142 kg)	34 1/4 in (0.87 m)	10 3/4 in (0.27 m)	6 ft 9 3/4 in (2.08 m)	5.16 s	1.84 s	2.93 s	4.56 s	7.65 s	32.0 in (0.81 m)	9 ft 6 in (2.90 m)	29 reps
All values from Louisiana-Monroe's Pro Day

=== Tampa Bay Buccaneers (first stint) ===
Allen signed with the Tampa Bay Buccaneers on May 12, 2014, after going undrafted in the 2014 NFL draft. He was released by the Buccaneers on August 31.

=== Green Bay Packers ===
Allen was signed to the Green Bay Packers' practice squad on September 3, 2014. He was released by the Packers on September 23.

=== Tampa Bay Buccaneers (second stint) ===
Allen was signed to the Buccaneers' practice squad on September 25, 2014. He was promoted to the active roster on November 29. Allen made his NFL debut on December 14, against the Carolina Panthers. He played in three games overall during the 2014 season, appearing in 45 snaps on offense.

Allen was cut by the Buccaneers on September 1, 2015. The following day, he was placed on injured reserve. On September 9, Allen was waived from injured reserve. On November 18, Allen was re-signed to the Buccaneers' practice squad.

On January 5, 2016, Allen signed a reserve/future contract with the Buccaneers. On September 3, Allen was released by the Buccaneers as part of final roster cuts. The next day, he was re-signed to the Buccaneers' practice squad. Allen was promoted to the active roster on November 22. He was released by Tampa Bay on December 10.

=== San Francisco 49ers ===
Allen was claimed off waivers by the San Francisco 49ers on December 12, 2016. He was released by San Francisco on December 21.

=== Tampa Bay Buccaneers (third stint) ===
On December 27, 2016, Allen was re-signed to the Tampa Bay Buccaneers' practice squad. He signed a reserve/future contract with the Buccaneers on January 2, 2017. Allen was waived by the Buccaneers on September 2.

=== Calgary Stampeders ===
Allen was signed to the Calgary Stampeders' practice roster on October 16, 2017.

=== Arizona Cardinals ===
On January 2, 2018, Allen signed a reserve/future contract with the Arizona Cardinals. He was waived by the Cardinals on September 1.

=== Arizona Hotshots ===
In 2019, Allen joined the Arizona Hotshots of the Alliance of American Football. He started all eight games at offensive guard for the Hotshots as the team went 5–3. The league ceased operations in April 2019 with two weeks left in the regular season.

=== Dallas Renegades ===
Allen was selected by the Dallas Renegades in the 6th round, in phase two, of the 2020 XFL draft. He played in four games as a backup offensive guard during the 2020 XFL season. He had his contract terminated when the league suspended operations on April 10, 2020.
