= Lake Ridge =

Lake Ridge may refer to:

- Lake Ridge, Dallas County, Texas
- Lake Ridge, Virginia
- Lake Ridge Academy, in North Ridgeville, Ohio
- Lake Ridge High School, in Mansfield, Texas

== See also ==
- Lakeridge (disambiguation)
