= Cedar Mill (disambiguation) =

Cedar Mill is a suburb of Portland, Oregon.

Cedar Mill may also refer to:

- Cedar Mill, California
- Cedar Mill, Ashton-under-Lyne
- Intel Cedar Mill, a revised version of the Pentium 4 'Netburst' CPU core introduced in 2006

== See also ==
- Cedar Mills, Minnesota
- Cedar Hill (disambiguation)
