= Quincy Adeboyejo =

American football player (born 1995)

No. 18
- Position: Wide receiver

Personal information
- Born: May 26, 1995 (age 31); Cedar Hill, Texas, U.S.
- Listed height: 6 ft 3 in (1.91 m)
- Listed weight: 200 lb (91 kg)

Career information
- High school: Cedar Hill (Cedar Hill, Texas)
- College: Ole Miss (2013–2016)
- NFL draft: 2017: undrafted

Career history
- Baltimore Ravens (2017–2018); New York Jets (2019)*; New England Patriots (2019–2020)*; Michigan Panthers (2022)*
- * Offseason or practice squad member only

Quincy Oluwadare Adeboyejo (born May 26, 1995) is an American former professional football wide receiver. He played college football at Ole Miss.

== Early life ==
Adeboyejo attended Cedar Hill High School, in Cedar Hill, Texas, where he played for the football team and ran track. He was a member of USA Football's Under-19 national team that competed at the 2013 International Bowl and was named as an Associated Press All-State honorable mention selection after recording 91 catches for 1,265 yards and 17 touchdowns as a senior. He helped lead Cedar Hill to the Texas Class 5A Division 2 State Championship game, losing to perennial state power Katy High School by a score of 35–24. As a result of a successful high school career, he was rated as a four-star recruit, the 42nd ranked wide receiver in the nation, and the 43rd ranked recruit in the state of Texas by the Rivals.com recruiting service. He was rated as a three-star recruit by the Scout.com recruiting service, 247Sports.com, and ESPN.com. He committed to Ole Miss to play college football under head coach Hugh Freeze.

== College career ==
Adeboyejo played in 51 games at Ole Miss. In his career with the Rebels, he recorded 106 catches for 1,454 yards and 11 touchdowns.

=== 2013 season ===
In his freshman season with the Rebels, Adeboyejo recorded meaningful statistics in five games. Against the Southeast Missouri State Redhawks at Vaught–Hemingway Stadium, he had his first career collegiate reception for six yards in a 31–13 victory. A few weeks later against SEC West Rival Texas A&M, Adeboyejo caught three receptions for 33 yards in a 41–38 loss at home. Against Troy, he would catch his first career touchdown, a 24-yard pass from Bo Wallace, in the 51–21 home victory. Against Georgia Tech in the 2013 Music City Bowl at LP Field in Nashville, Tennessee, he had one reception for 16 yards. In his freshman season, Adeboyejo would total seven receptions for 81 yards and one touchdown.

=== 2014 season ===
Adeboyejo recorded meaningful statistics in nine games in sophomore season with the Rebels. In the season opener against Boise State at the Georgia Dome, he had two receptions for 29 yards, including a 31-yard touchdown reception from Bo Wallace, in the 35–13 victory. The next week against conference foe Vanderbilt, he had five receptions for 57 yards in the 41–3 home victory. Against SEC West rival Alabama at home, he was held to no receptions but did have a rushing attempt for -1 yards in the Rebels' 23–17 upset victory over the Crimson Tide. Against Texas A&M at Kyle Field, he would have a 33-yard touchdown reception from Bo Wallace in the third quarter of the 35–20 victory. Against SEC West rival Arkansas at Donald W. Reynolds Razorback Stadium, he would have a season-high six receptions for a season-high 73 yards in the 30–0 defeat. Against TCU in the 2014 Peach Bowl at the Georgia Dome, he was held to one reception for 10 yards. Overall, in his sophomore season, Adeboyejo had 26 receptions for 313 yards and two touchdowns.

=== 2015 season ===
Adeboyejo made contributions in twelve games of his junior season with the Rebels. In the season opener against UT Martin at home, he had a 15-yard touchdown reception from Chad Kelly in the 76–3 victory over the Skyhawks. The next week, he had a career day against Fresno State in a 73–21 home victory. He had five receptions for 120 yards and three touchdowns. The three touchdowns were a 16-yard reception, 50-yard reception, and a 44-yard reception from Chad Kelly. The next game for the Rebels would be against Alabama. In the third quarter of the game, Chad Kelly fielded a bad snap and threw the ball high in the air in an attempt to get the ball to wide receiver Laquon Treadwell in double coverage. The ball bounced off of Treadwell and the two Alabama defenders into the hands of Adeboyejo, who took the pass 66 yards for a touchdown. The touchdown was vital in the Rebels' 43–37 upset victory over the Crimson Tide at Bryant–Denny Stadium. On October 17, against Memphis at Liberty Bowl Memorial Stadium, he caught a 68-yard touchdown from Treadwell on a trick play. The Rebels would lose to the Tigers in a 37–24 upset though. Against Arkansas in a 53–52 overtime defeat at home, he had a crucial 18-yard touchdown reception from Chad Kelly in the fourth quarter to give Ole Miss a late lead in the game, which did not hold. Against Oklahoma State in the 2016 Sugar Bowl at the Mercedes-Benz Superdome in New Orleans, Louisiana, he was held to one reception for 23 yards in the 48–20 victory. Overall, in his junior season, Adeboyejo had 38 receptions for 604 yards and seven touchdowns.

=== 2016 season ===
Adeboyejo appeared in all 12 games in his senior season with the Rebels. However, his production would drop from his solid 2015 campaign. Against Florida State at Camping World Stadium in Orlando, Florida, he had two receptions for 40 yards in the 45–34 season-opening loss. Against Wofford at home, he had one receptions for six yards, which was a touchdown pass from Chad Kelly, in the 38–13 victory. This touchdown would be Adeboyejo's only one of the season. Against Auburn at home on October 29, he had a season high 76 receiving yards on four catches in the 40–29 defeat. In the final game of his collegiate career, Adeboyejo had three receptions for 40 yards against Mississippi State in a 55–20 defeat at home in the Egg Bowl. The Rebels would fail to make a bowl game with a 5–7 record in Adeboyejo's final season with the team. Overall, in his senior season, Adeboyejo had 35 receptions for 456 and one touchdown.

=== Statistics ===
Season	Team	Receiving			
Season	Team	Rec	Yards	Avg	TD
2013	Ole Miss	7	81	11.6	1
2014	Ole Miss	26	313	12.0	2
2015	Ole Miss	38	604	15.9	7
2016	Ole Miss	35	456	13.0	1
Total		106	1,454	13.7	11

== Professional career ==
Pre-draft measurables
Height	Weight	40-yard dash	20-yard shuttle	Three-cone drill	Vertical jump	Broad jump	Bench press
6 ft 3 in (1.91 m)	197 lb (89 kg)	4.42 s	4.14 s	6.73 s	34.5 in (0.88 m)	12 ft 3 in (3.73 m)	8 reps
All values from NFL Combine

=== Baltimore Ravens ===
Adeboyejo signed with the Baltimore Ravens as an undrafted free agent on May 5, 2017. He was waived on September 2, 2017, and was signed to the Ravens' practice squad the next day. He was promoted to the active roster on December 26, 2017.

On August 31, 2018, Adeboyejo was placed on the physically unable to perform list with a leg injury.

On July 25, 2019, Adeboyejo was waived with a non-football injury designation.

=== New York Jets ===
On August 22, 2019, Adeboyejo was signed by the New York Jets. He was waived on August 31, 2019.

=== New England Patriots ===
On November 20, 2019, Adeboyejo was signed to the New England Patriots practice squad. He signed a reserve/future contract with the Patriots on January 6, 2020. On August 15, 2020, he was waived/injured by the Patriots and subsequently reverted to injured reserve the next day. He was not given a contract by the Patriots for the 2021 season and became a free agent on March 25, 2021.

=== Michigan Panthers ===
Adeboyejo was selected with the sixth pick in the 13th round of the 2022 USFL draft by the Michigan Panthers, however he opted out of the 2022 season for health reasons.

== Personal life ==
Quincy is the son of Bayo and Bola Adeboyejo and is the youngest of four.
