= Cedar Hill State Park =

State park in Texas, United States

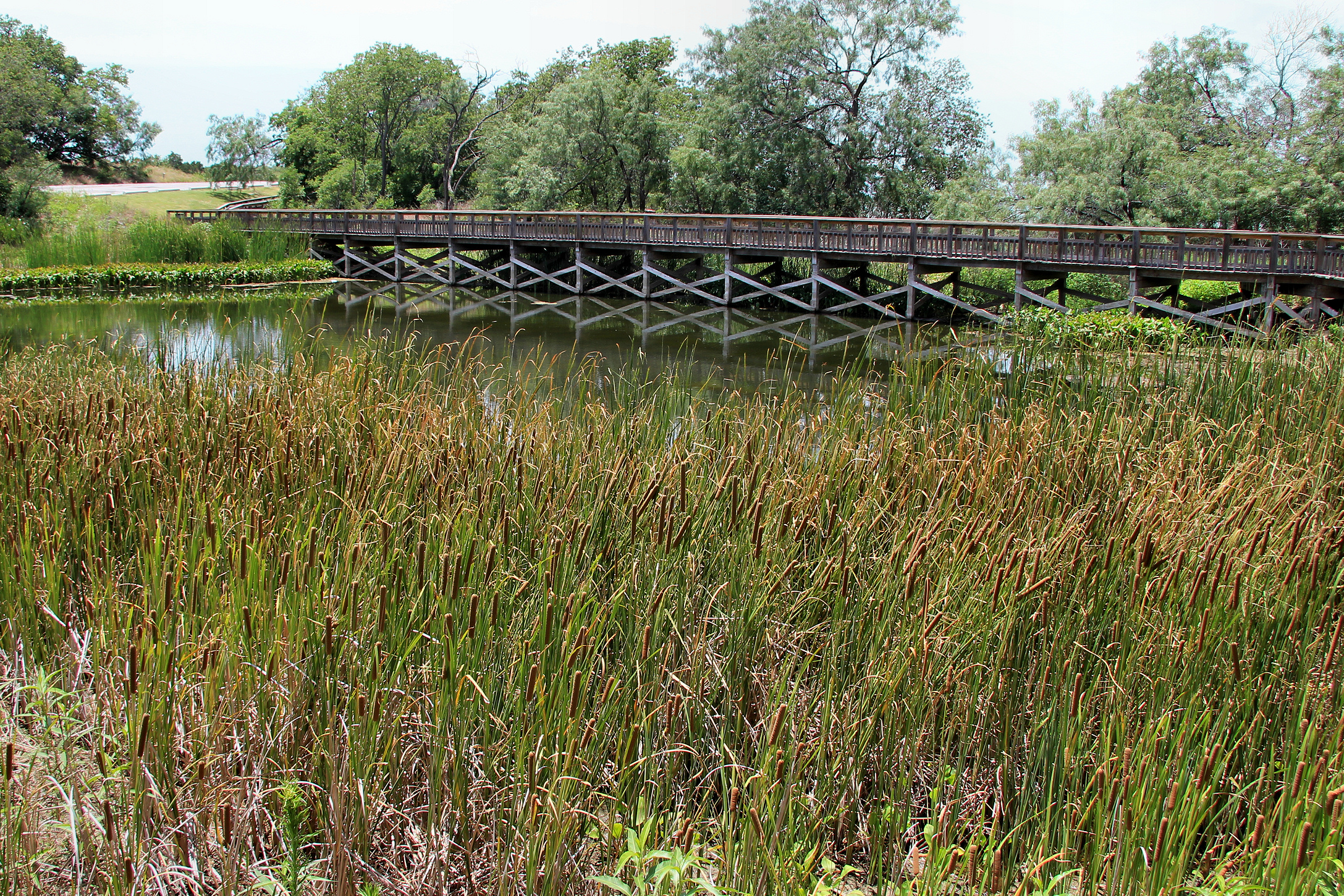
- Wetlands area in Cedar Hill State Park

- Location within Texas Location within the United States
- Location: Dallas County, Texas
- Nearest city: Dallas
- Coordinates: 32°36′21″N 96°59′57″W
- Area: 1,826 acres (739 ha)
- Established: 1982
- Visitors: 375,769 (in 2025)
- Governing body: Texas Parks and Wildlife Department
- Website: Official site

Cedar Hill State Park is a 1,826 acres (739 ha) state park located on FM 1382 and the eastern shore of Joe Pool Lake in Cedar Hill, Texas, United States. The park was acquired in 1982 and was opened in 1991. The Texas Parks and Wildlife Department operates the park.

== Features ==
Cedar Hill State Park has two available camping areas, a boat ramp, a small picnic area, and two fishing piers.

=== Penn Farm Agricultural History Center ===
The Penn Farm Agricultural History Center is located within the boundaries. John Wesley Penn established the farm in 1859. Although it is named Penn Farm, ranching was the main focus of the farm for most of its existence. The Penn family owned and ran the farm until 1970. The farm has reconstructed and historic buildings from the mid-19th century through the mid-20th century and displays of farm equipment from the late 1800s and early-to mid 1900s.

=== DORBA Trail ===
Designed, built and maintained by the Dallas Off-Road Bike Association (DORBA), the DORBA Trail is 12 miles long and consists of three concentric paths — 3 miles (short), 8 miles (medium), and 12 miles (long). The trail is multi-use for biking and hiking. Bikers travel clockwise around the loops and hikers travel counterclockwise.

== Nature ==
The park lies at the intersection of two ecoregions - cross timbers and blackland prairie. It features over 200 species of birds, as well as various mammals and fish in Joe Pool Lake. The area has over 4 miles of hiking trails in addition to the DORBA trails. The park also features a number of creeks, including Baggett Branch, which flows into Joe Pool Lake.

== See also ==
- List of Texas state parks
