= Lakeridge =

Lakeridge may refer to:

- Lakeridge, Nevada
- Lakeridge, Saskatoon, Saskatchewan
- Lakeridge, West Hill, King County, Washington
- Lakeridge High School in Lake Oswego, Oregon

== See also ==
- Lake Ridge (disambiguation)
