= Cedar Hills =

Cedar Hills may refer to:

- Cedar Hills, Utah, a city in Utah County, Utah, United States
- Cedar Hills, Oregon, a census-designated place and neighborhood in Washington County, Oregon, United States
- Cedar Hills (Idaho-Utah), a small mountain range in the United States that extends between Cassia County, Idaho and Box Elder County, Utah, with the northernmost portion being located in the City of Rock National Reserve
- Cedar Hills (Sanpete County, Utah), a small mountain range the United States

== See also ==
- Cedar Hill (disambiguation)
- Cedar Mountains (disambiguation)
