= Cedar Hill High School =

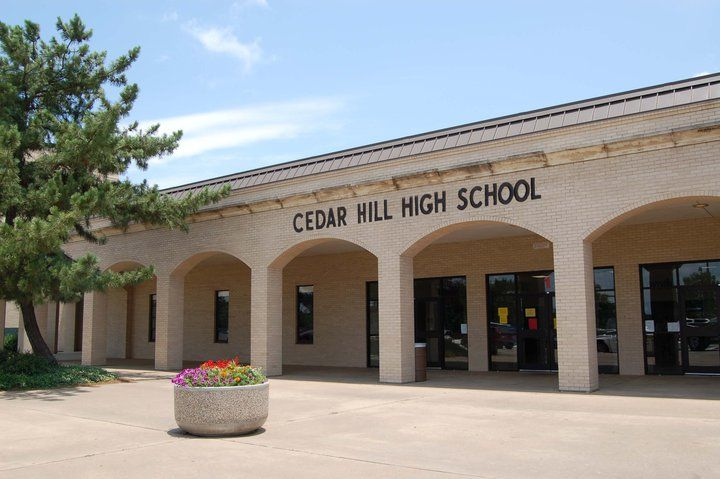

Location
- 1 Longhorn Boulevard; Cedar Hill, Texas 75104; United States; 32.581065°N 96.950183°W

Information
- School type: Public high school
- Motto: Putting Respect In Decisions Every Day
- School district: Cedar Hill Independent School District
- Principal: Leroy Joffre
- Teaching staff: 141.27 (FTE)
- Grades: 9-12
- Enrollment: 2,075 (2023-2024)
- Student to teacher ratio: 14.69
- Colors: Red & Black
- Athletics conference: UIL Class 6A
- Mascot: Longhorn/Lady Longhorn
- Rival: Desoto High School and Duncanville High School
- Newspaper: The Hoofbeat
- Yearbook: The Longhorn
- Website: chhs.chisd.net

Cedar Hill High School (CHHS) is a comprehensive public high school located in the city of Cedar Hill, Texas (USA) in Dallas County and is classified as a 6A school by the UIL. It is a part of the Cedar Hill Independent School District located in southwest Dallas County. In 2018-19, the school received a "C" rating by the Texas Education Agency

The district, and therefore the school, serves most of the city of Cedar Hill and portions of Grand Prairie, Ovilla, Duncanville and Dallas.

== Academics ==
Cedar Hill has several Advanced Placement courses which allow ambitious students an opportunity to take college-level courses on campus. Cedar Hill established a S.T.E.A.M. program in 2015-2016 academic year which is designed to groom and engage students seriously interested in pursuing a career in science, technology, engineering, arts, or mathematics.

== Demographics ==
In 2018-19, 73.3 percent of the students were Foundational Black American, 19.9% Hispanic, 3% Two or More Races, and 1% Other.

== Athletics ==
The Cedar Hill Longhorns compete in the following sports:

- Baseball
- Basketball
- Cross Country
- Football
- Golf
- Powerlifting
- Soccer
- Softball
- Swimming and Diving
- Tennis
- Track and Field
- Volleyball

=== Marching Band and CHHS Cheer ===
The Cedar Hill Longhorn Red Army Marching Band and Cheerleaders are the two largest student organizations dedicated to supporting CHHS athletics.

=== State titles ===
- Football.
  - 2006 5A Division II (defeated Houston Cypress Falls)
  - 2013 5A Division II (defeated Katy)
  - 2014 6A Division II (defeated Katy)

On December 23, 2006, the 16-0 Cedar Hill High School Longhorn football team won its first state championship, defeating Cypress Falls 51-17 at the Alamodome in San Antonio.

On December 21, 2013, the football team won its second state title, defeating Katy High School 34-24 at AT&T Stadium in Arlington, Texas.

In 2014, Cedar Hill football program was ranked as one of the nation's Top 10.

=== Rivalry ===
Cedar Hill maintains a notable rivalry with the nearby DeSoto High School. The rivalry is known as the "Battle of the Belt Line".

== Notable alumni ==
- Quincy Adeboyejo, professional football player
- Josh Allen, professional football player
- Messiah Bright, professional soccer player
- Dezmon Briscoe, former professional football player
- Trevis Gipson, football player
- Thomas Gipson, professional basketball player and brother of Trevis.
- Joyner Holmes, American professional basketball player
- Daniel Horton, former professional basketball player
- Ugo Ihemelu, professional soccer player
- Garret McGuire, college football coach
- T-Dre Player, professional football player
- Jason Richardson, silver medalist in the 110m hurdles at the 2012 Summer Olympics in London.
- Josh Thomas, professional football player
- Derrius Thompson, former professional football player and current Cedar Hill Teacher/Coach
- Kankan, underground rapper
