= Cedar Hill, Virginia =

Unincorporated community in Virginia, US

Coordinates: 36°51′00″N 79°18′47″W

Cedar Hill is an unincorporated community in Pittsylvania County, in the U.S. state of Virginia.
