= Cedar Hill Church and Cemeteries =

Historic site in Rockbridge County, Virginia, US

- U.S. National Register of Historic Places
- Virginia Landmarks Register
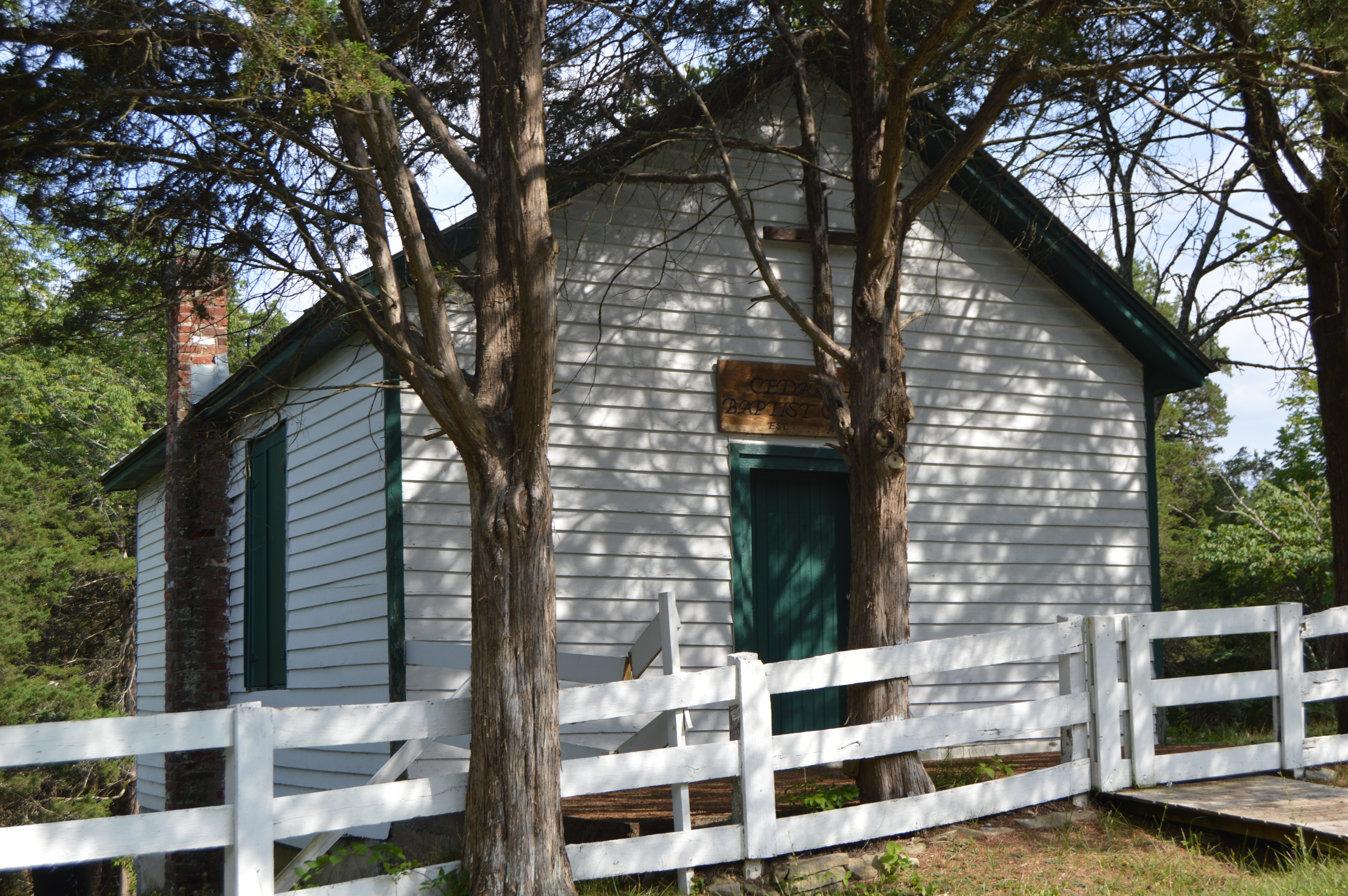
- Church, front and northern side

- Location within Virginia Location within the United States
- Location: Cedar Hill Church Rd. and Kygers Hill Rd., near Lexington, Virginia
- Coordinates: 37°44′32″N 79°32′6″W
- Area: 1 acre (0.40 ha)
- Built: 1874
- NRHP reference No.: 01001570
- VLR No.: 081-5466

Significant dates
- Added to NRHP: February 11, 2002
- Designated VLR: September 12, 2001

The Cedar Hill Church and Cemeteries are located in historic Rockbridge County, Virginia. The small log church, which also served as a schoolhouse, was built in 1874 evoking the history of Rockbridge County's African American community. The land was given by a white farmer named John Replogle and transferred to" Trustees for the Colored Baptist Congregation" A cemetery was established behind the church, marked today by a scattering of field stone memorials. Because of the rocky ground, a new cemetery was laid out at a separate location around 1890 and is still in use. The Cedar Hill congregation was formed shortly after the Civil War. It consisted of African Americans that basically worked and lived on white-owned farms. The meetings were held in a log dwelling southwest of the present church. Later, the congregation met under a large oak tree that stood approximately one and a half miles west of the present church. Cedar Hill's oak tree meeting-place was similar to the brush arbor churches that many freedman congregations established in Virginia following the Civil war as temporary shelter. It is said that many members were buried near that oak tree that was called as the "Gospel Tree". The tree was destroyed by lightning around 1890, but the stump is still visible and a limb from it is kept at the present church as a historic memento.

By the late 1920s, the church began to lose many of its key members. Most moved to the nearest city, Lexington, where there was better opportunities for work and education. After 1939, the church sat idle for 26 years until a yearly homecoming was established in 1965. The annual homecomings are held at the church on the third Sunday in August.

Cedar Hill is acknowledged as an important site and illustration the African American heritage of rural Rockbridge County, Va. The Church is registered with the United States Department of the Interior National Park Service and National Register of Historic Places.

Cedar Hill Church and Cemeteries is a historic African-American church and two cemeteries located near Lexington, Rockbridge County, Virginia. It was built in 1874, and is a one-story, one room, log building sheathed in plain and beaded boards. Also on the property are the Old Cemetery, used during the late-19th century, and the New Cemetery, established in 1890 and still in use.

It was listed on the National Register of Historic Places in 2002.
