= Cedar Hill Collegiate High School =

High school in Texas, United States

Coordinates: 32.5948°N 96.9736°W

Information
- Established: 2008; 18 years ago
- Website: chcahs.chisd.net

Cedar Hill Collegiate High School (also known as CHCHS) is an early college high school that gives students the opportunity to finish high school while receiving an associate degree (60 college credits). Collegiate opened in 2008 and graduated its first class of seniors in 2012. The campus has an "A" rating from the TEA in 2018–2019.

The high school, a part of the Cedar Hill Independent School District, is a district charter school that allows students to enroll not only from Cedar Hill, but from the surrounding cities including DeSoto, Lancaster, Mansfield, Grand Prairie, and Duncanville. According to the TEA, the school has at least 99% of the student body passing each section of the STAAR test. Cedar Hill Collegiate High School has been ranked the 10th best early college high school and the 131st best high school in the nation, earning a bronze medal from the U.S. News & World Report Ranking in 2014 and 2015.

The admission process typically involves filling out an application form and being interviewed by the principal and teachers; however, the interview was not mandatory for students applying in for enrollment in the 2016–2017 school year. Confirmation is still needed for students enrolling in the following years. Upon the notification of acceptance, incoming freshmen students are expected to attend a summer bridge program at the campus. The school only allows a maximum of 100 students per each grade level, though the student can choose to drop out of the program. Once the student drops out, there is no re-entering. Collegiate High serves ninth through 12th grade scholars. Currently, Mr. Heath Koenig serves as the school Chancellor. The school now offers middle school for grades 6th, 7th, and 8th. In the 2017–2018 school year, the middle school was recognized for Seven Distinctions throughout the State of Texas.

== Demographics ==
The school's racial background is 48% African American, 36.7% Hispanic, 7.3% White, 5.4% Asian and 2.7% other. As of 2015, the school has 371 students, and 42.6% are economically disadvantaged.

== Partnership ==
Cedar Hill Collegiate is a partnership with Cedar Valley Community College. Students have what is known as dual credit—attaining both college and high school credit at the same time. During the school year, the junior and senior students go to Cedar Valley College full-time.
