= Cedar Hill Prep School =

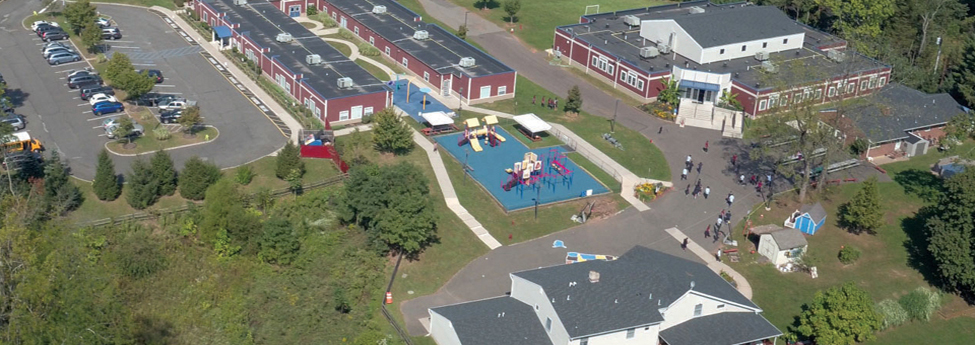

Location
- 152 Cedar Grove Lane; Somerset, NJ 08873
- 40.5207°N 74.5231°W

Information
- Type: Private school
- Established: 2003
- Principal: Donald Seeley
- Founder: Nandini Menon
- Faculty: 48
- Grades: Preschool-Grade 8
- Enrollment: 250 (as of 2025-26)
- Student to teacher ratio: 10:1
- Accreditation: Blue Ribbon
- Website: https://cedarhillprep.com

Cedar Hill Prep School is a non-sectarian private school in the Somerset section of Franklin Township, New Jersey, offering education from Preschool to Grade 8.

Cedar Hill Prep School services students from 23 towns around the New Jersey-Pennsylvania region. Akin to trends throughout the United States, Somerset's and central New Jersey's fastest growing subgroups among the school-age population are the 'English Language Learners' (ELL).

The school educates children from towns in central New Jersey including Somerset, south Bound Brook, Bridgewater Township, New Brunswick, North Brunswick, South Brunswick, South Plainfield, Edison and Piscataway.

As of the 2025–26, the school had an enrollment of 250 students, and 40 classroom teachers (on an FTE basis), for a student–teacher ratio of 10:1.

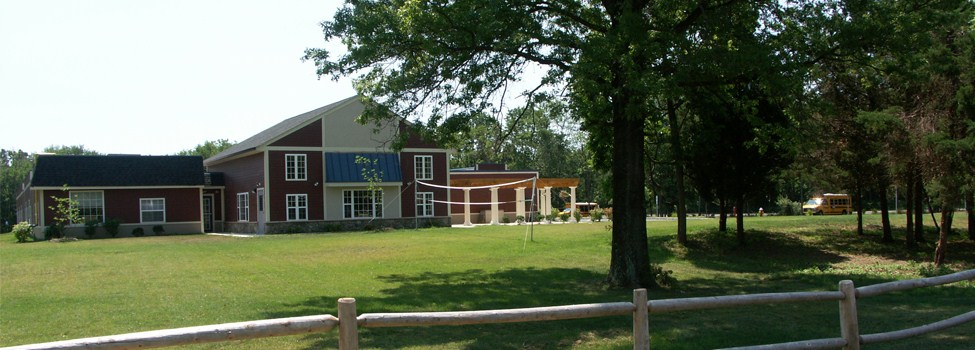
The school in 2010

== History ==
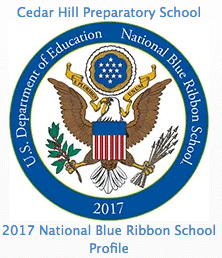
National Blue Ribbon School

Cedar Hill Prep School was founded in 2003 under the name Oakcrest Academy. Cedar Hill Prep School/Oakcrest Academy was founded by Nandini Menon and Raghu Menon.

The turning point for Oakcrest Academy was in 2006, when the school had reached its full capacity. The options were to either limit the growth or to be a full-fledged Elementary / Middle school. The founders bought a 9-acre property. The new building was ready in February 2007 and the school was christened Cedar Hill Prep School.

== Curriculum ==
- Preschool to kindergarten – Language Arts, Mathematics, Science, Social Studies, French, Spanish, Music and Visual Art.
- Elementary school - Language Arts, Mathematics, Science, Social Studies, French, Spanish, Technology, Chorus, String Instruments, Drama, Performing Arts, and Visual Art, Experiential Learning, Scientific Research.
- Middle school - Language Arts, Mathematics, Science, Engineering, Technology, Social Studies, French, Spanish, Chorus, Theater, String Instruments, Performing Arts, Graphic Design, and Visual Art, Experiential Learning, Scientific Research.

== Administration ==
- Nandini Menon, Founder
- Donald Seeley, Principal
