= Cedar Hill, North Carolina =

Unincorporated community in North Carolina, US

Coordinates: 36°22′01″N 80°31′52″W

Cedar Hill is an unincorporated community in Surry County, North Carolina, United States, located near the town of Pilot Mountain. Prominent landmarks include Cedar Hills Primitive Baptist Church.
