= Joe Pool Lake =

Reservoir in Dallas, Texas, USA

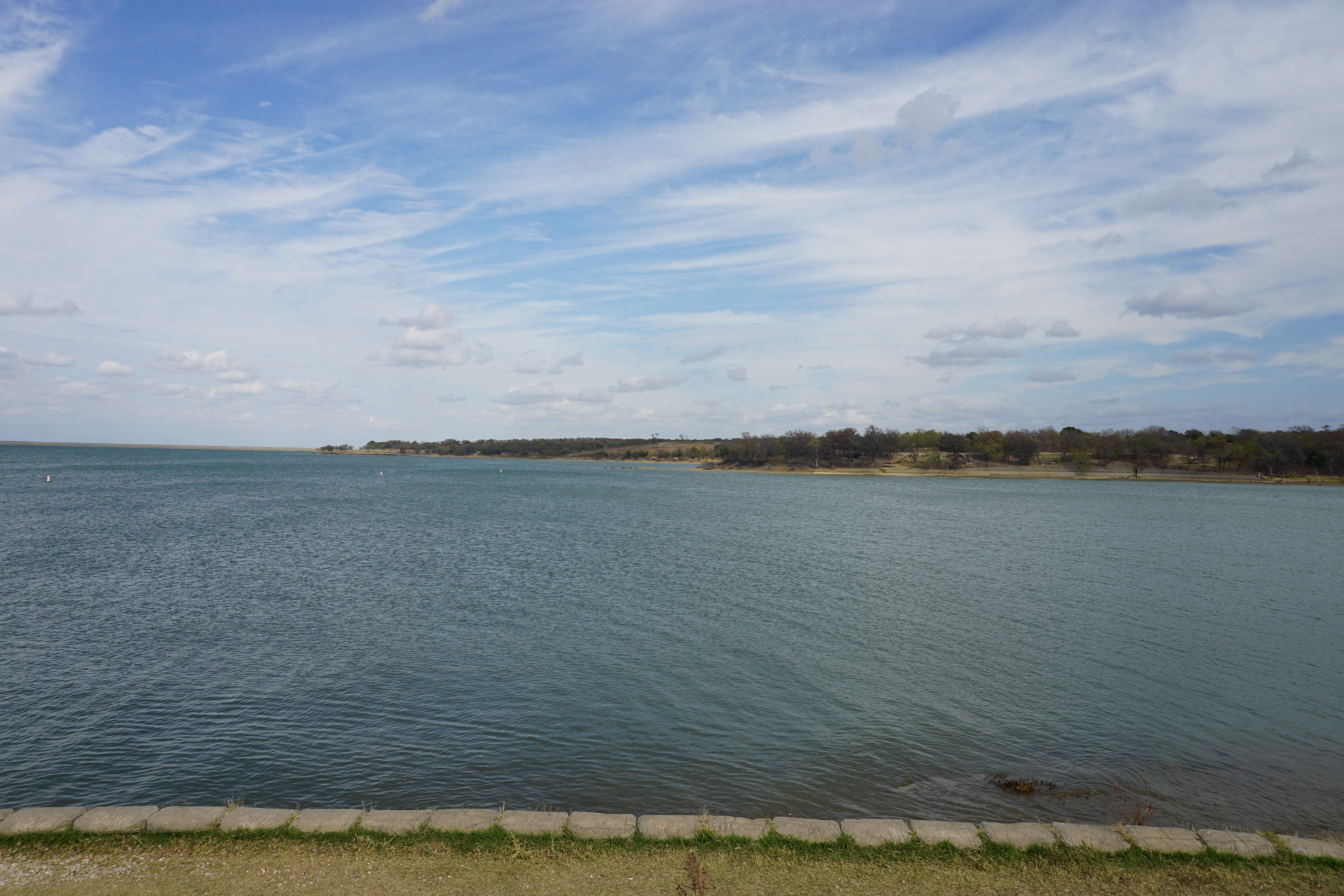

- Location within Texas Location within the United States
- Location: Dallas / Tarrant / Ellis counties, Texas, United States
- Coordinates: 32°37′43″N 97°0′19″W
- Catchment area: 233 sq mi (600 km^{2})
- Basin countries: United States
- Surface area: 7,740 acres (31.3 km^{2})
- Max. depth: 75 ft (23 m)

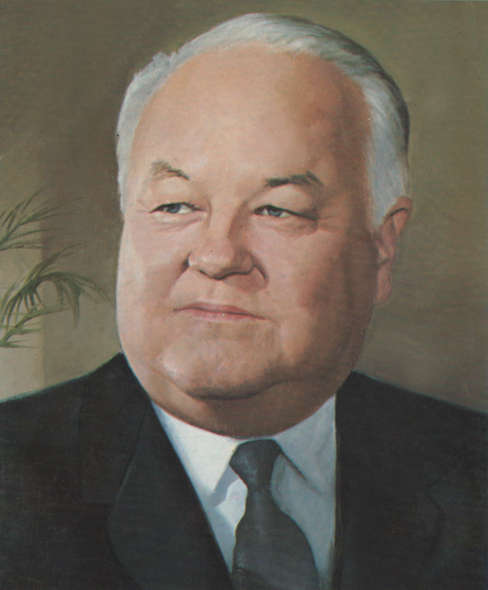
Joe R. Pool United States Congress

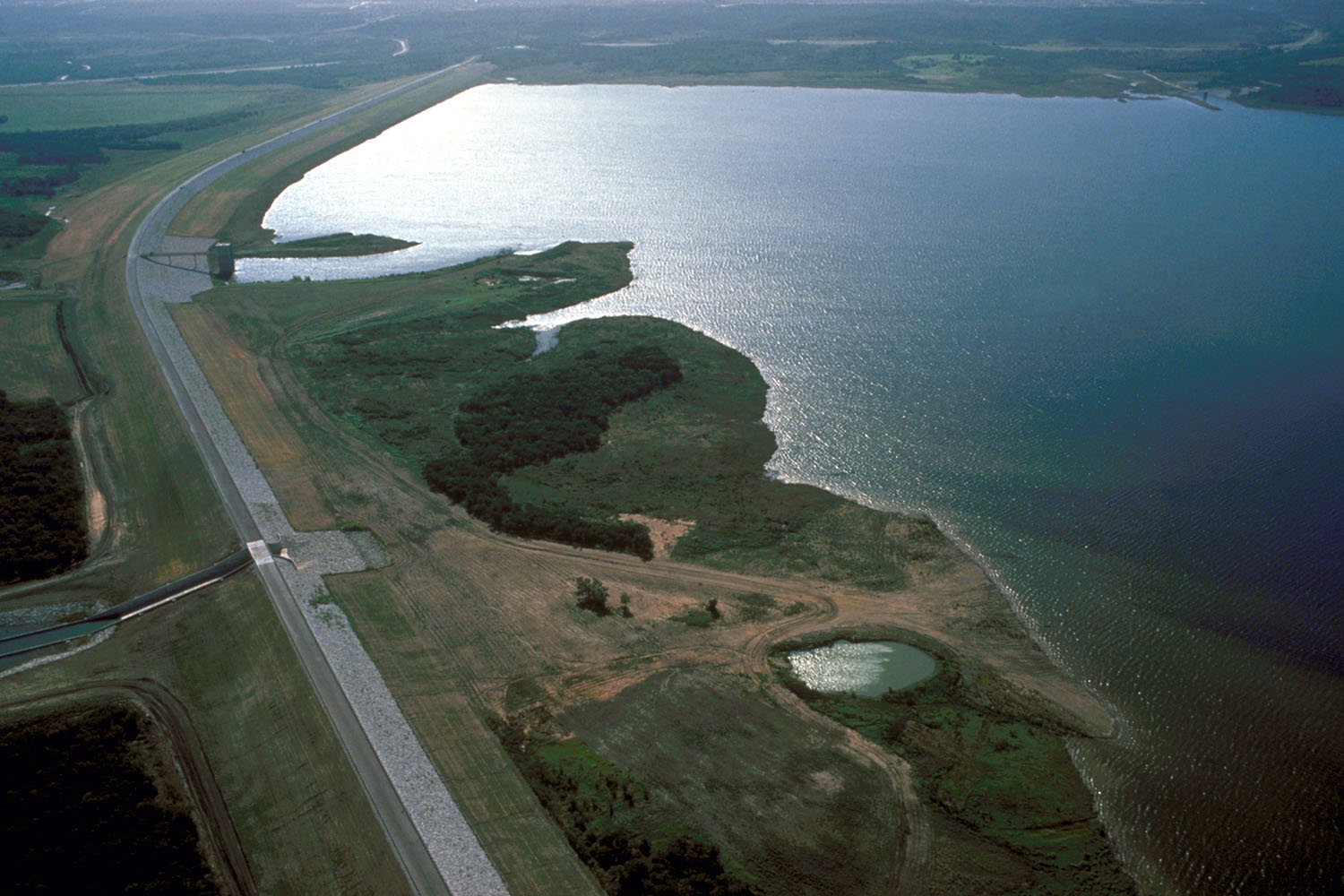
Aerial view of Joe Pool Lake and Dam

Joe Pool Lake is a fresh water impoundment (reservoir) located in the southern part of the Dallas/Fort Worth Metroplex in North Texas. The lake encompasses parts of Tarrant, Dallas and Ellis counties. The lake measures 7,740 acres (31.3 km^{2}) with a conservation storage capacity of 176,900 acre-feet (218,200,000 m^{3}). With a maximum depth of 75 feet (23 m) the lake drains an area of 232 square miles (601 km^{2}).

Joe Pool Lake was named after Joe R. Pool, a Congressman-At-Large from the Oak Cliff area of Dallas who represented this area as well as the rest of the state of Texas from 1963 until his death in 1968. Pool was highly influential in the passage of legislation and funding of the lake. The project to build Joe Pool Lake initiated by a promise made in 1960 by Kennedy-Johnson Natural Resources Advisory Committee member Joe Pool and was carried out, after Pool's death in 1968, by a citizens committee called the Lakeview (Joe Pool) Planning Council. Pool's project was approved by Congress in 1965 and was known as Lakeview Reservoir until 1982 when president Ronald W. Reagan signed a bill to rename the lake to Joe Pool Lake. Actual construction began in 1977, bridge work was finished in 1981, with lake completion in December 1985. Impoundment of water began in January 1986 and the lake was filled by June 1989.

After 60 years, through the sheer determination of Joe Pool, his congressional friends and the many members of the Lakeview (Joe Pool) Planning Council, Pool's promise of flood control for the Mountain/Walnut Creek watershed was made good to the affected property owners.

"On May 24, 1986 with the lake approximately half full and still several years away from being open to the public, a ceremony was held to dedicate the new Joe Pool Lake. 1,500 people attended including U.S. Democratic Majority Leader Jim Wright, who among others, had helped keep the project alive through the years. There was food, music, cannons, and speeches. Joe Pool would have been proud to be there."

== Parks and recreation ==
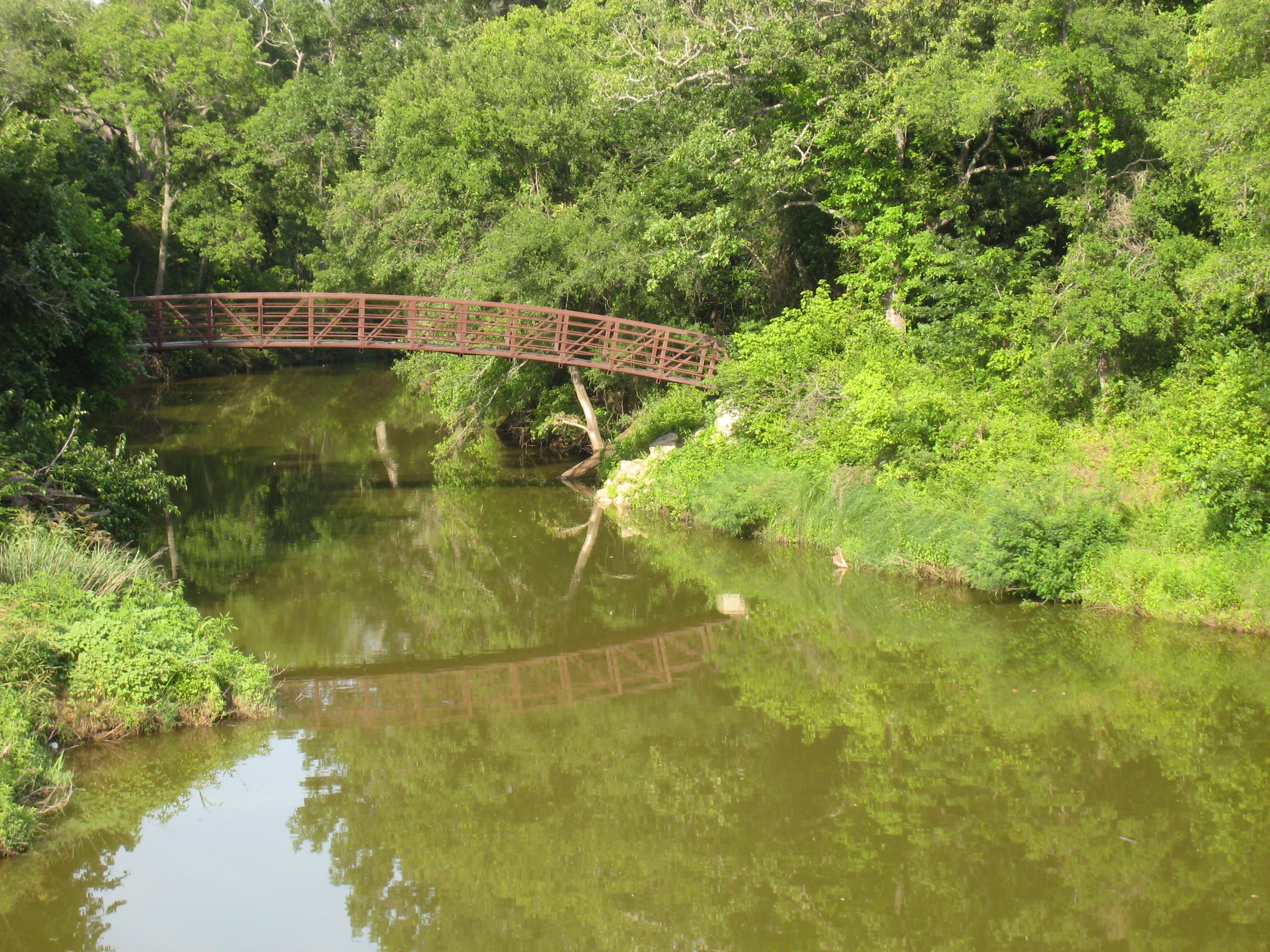
Loyd Park

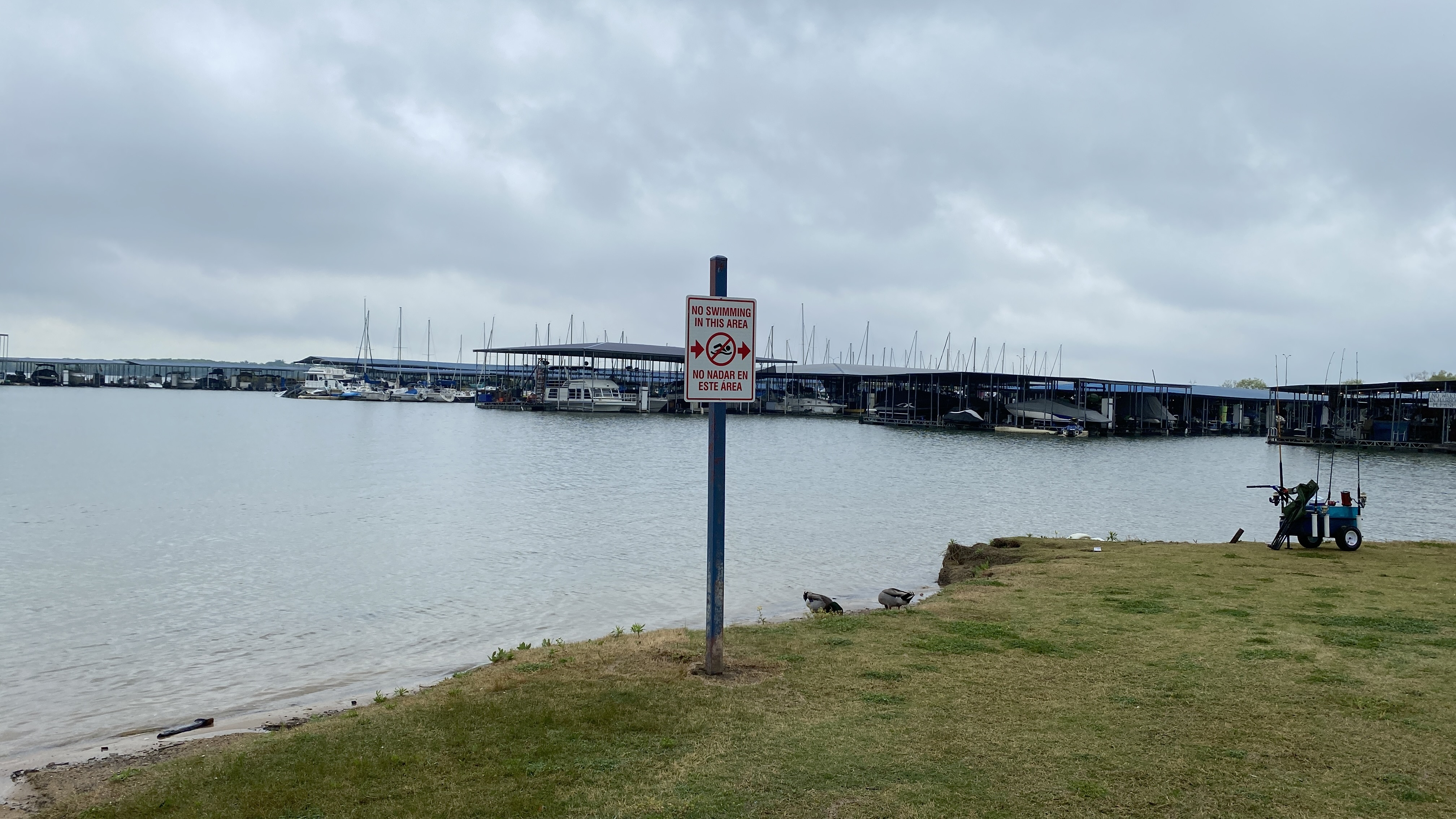
Lynn Creek Park

Joe Pool Lake includes a number of parks, paved boat ramps and parking lots, public swimming areas, a public marina as well a second marina located inside Cedar Hill State Park. Other parks include Britton Park, Loyd Park, and Lynn Creek Park.

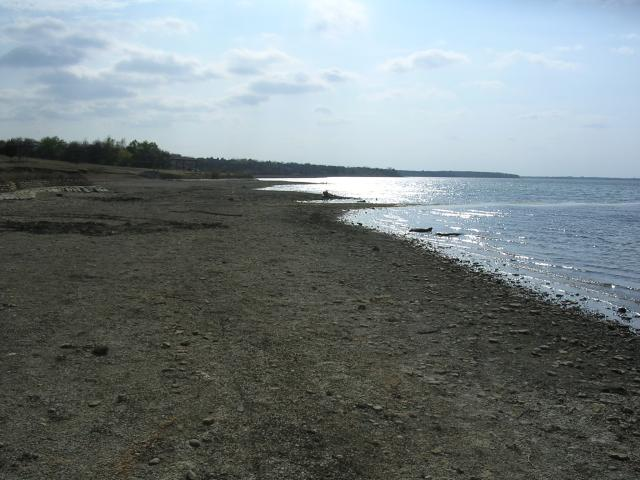
Joe Pool Lake Shoreline

=== Lynn Creek Marina ===
A full-service marina and restaurant are located on the northwest side of the lake, just off Lake Ridge Parkway near the Lynn Creek Park entrance. The Lynn Creek Marina has 258 wet slips, 40 dry storage slips. a ship store and service center. All facilities are available to the public on first-come, first-served, for fishing, pleasure, and sailboats; boat rentals; with an indoor-outdoor fishing area; and Patio Bar & Grill.

== Water Resources ==
Joe Pool lake is mostly fed by Mountain Creek and Walnut Creek and drains north into Mountain Creek leading into Mountain Creek Lake. Joe Pool Lake is one of the few lakes in Texas that actually drains to the north. Joe Pool lake impounds water in two arms formed by Mountain Creek and Walnut Creek. The Mountain Creek Water Shed is in the Upper Trinity River Basin and has a length of 37 miles (60 km) and a total drainage area of 304 square miles (787 km^{2}).

Currently (2005) Joe Pool Lake serves as a reservoir for the City of Midlothian for their public water supply. Several other entities have water interests in Joe Pool Lake, but are not currently using the water resources. The City of Midlothian has a water intake structure in the southeast leg of the lake. They consume water at a daily rate anywhere from 1 million US gallons (3,800 m^{3}) in the winter months to 9 million US gallons (34,000 m^{3}) in the summer months. The Trinity River Authority of Texas also has a water intake structure in Cedar Hill State Park, but it currently not in use.

== Fishing ==
=== Fishing Regulations ===
Most species are currently managed with statewide regulations. The exception is a 14 to 21-inch (530 mm) slot limit on largemouth bass. Anglers may keep bass that are 14 inches (360 mm) or less in length, or 21 inches (530 mm) or greater. Daily bag for all species of black bass is 5 in combination, but only one largemouth bass 21 inches (530 mm) or greater may be retained each day.

=== Stocking history ===
Species	Year	Number stocked	Size
Bass, Florida Largemouth	2006	325,681	Fingerling
Bass, Florida Largemouth	2005	317,036	Fingerling
Bass, Florida Largemouth	2001	182,049	Fingerling
Bass, Florida Largemouth	1987	203,315	Fingerling
Bass, Florida Largemouth	1986	248,256	Fingerling
Bass, Florida Largemouth	1986	417,554	Fry
Bass, Florida Largemouth	1984	2,700	Fingerling
Bass, Florida Largemouth	1981	2,970	Fry
Bluegill, Coppernose	1986	5,290	
Bluegill, Coppernose	1985	125,000	
Bluegill, Coppernose	1981	19,950	
Catfish, Channel	1986	546,900	Fingerling
Catfish, Channel	1986	203,100	Fry
Shad, Threadfin	1981	1,080	

==== All-ages records ====
Rod & Reel
Species	Weight	Length	Date	Angler	Bait or lure
Bass, Largemouth	12.89 lb (5.85 kg)	24.00 in (610 mm)	March 5, 2006	Robert Gaston	
Bass, White	1.94 lb (0.88 kg)	17.00 in (432 mm)	June 18, 2005	David Hartnett	
Bluegill	0.38 lb (0.17 kg)	8.25 in (210 mm)	September 8, 2005	Chad Edwards	freelined corn
Bullhead, Yellow	1.57 lb (0.71 kg)	15.25 in (387 mm)	April 2, 2006	Alissa Lewis	worm
Carp, Common	12.02 lb (5.45 kg)	32.00 in (813 mm)	January 26, 2005	Chad Edwards	freelined bread
Carp, Grass	32.00 lb (14.51 kg)	40.00 in (1,016 mm)	June 5, 1997	Alex Alatorre	homemade dough bait
Catfish, Channel	10.89 lb (4.94 kg)	28.00 in (711 mm)	November 18, 2006	Trace Neatherlin	cut bait
Crappie, Black	2.03 lb (0.92 kg)	15.00 in (381 mm)	May 2, 2004	Scott Pekrul	splittail spinner
Crappie, White	2.59 lb (1.17 kg)	16.75 in (425 mm)	June 30, 1990	George T. Hearn	
Drum, Freshwater	9.38 lb (4.25 kg)	26.00 in (660 mm)	March 15, 2015	Aaron Woodard	
Sunfish, Green	0.65 lb (0.29 kg)	10.00 in (254 mm)	May 12, 1990	Richard Collins	
Sunfish, Longear	0.06 lb (0.027 kg)	4.81 in (122 mm)	September 10, 1995	Jay Largent	

Fly Fishing
Species	Weight	Length	Date	Angler	Bait or Lure
Bass, White	0.72	12.50	July 26, 2005	Howell Dodd	clouser
Sunfish, Green	0.42	8.31	July 3, 2003	Jody Moore	popping bug

Bow Fishing
Species	Weight	Length	Date	Angler	Bait or Lure
Buffalo, Smallmouth	16.30	27.50	December 26, 2005	Bennett Crow	
Carp, Common	21.13	34.25	December 10, 2006	Bennett Crow	

==== Junior angler records ====
Rod & Reel
Species	Weight	Length	Date	Angler	Bait or Lure
Bullhead, Yellow	1.57	15.25	April 2, 2006	Alissa Lewis	worm
Carp, Common	6.06	0.00	May 13, 2006	Trey Edwards III	boiled maize
Catfish, Channel	7.15	25.75	August 5, 2005	Alissa Lewis	worm

=== Fishing tips ===
Marked brush piles offer habitat in the lower end of the reservoir which are often good for both bass and crappie. Crappie fishing is also good under the bridges on both arms of the lake. In the Walnut Creek arm, the old creek channel is a good place to look for bass.

=== Fishing quality ===
- Largemouth bass: 3 of 5
- Catfish: 2 of 5
- Crappie: 3 of 5
- Sunfish: 2 of 5

=== Facilities ===
The TRA maintains excellent day use and overnight public recreation facilities. The only free boat ramp on the lake is at Britton Park on the upper end of the Mountain Creek Arm, although it is $5 to park. Cedar Hill State Park on the east side of the lake has the second most campsites of any facility in the state park system. It also has lighted fishing piers, boat ramps and group shelters.

== See also ==
- Trinity River Authority
