= Cedar Hill, Texas =

- City
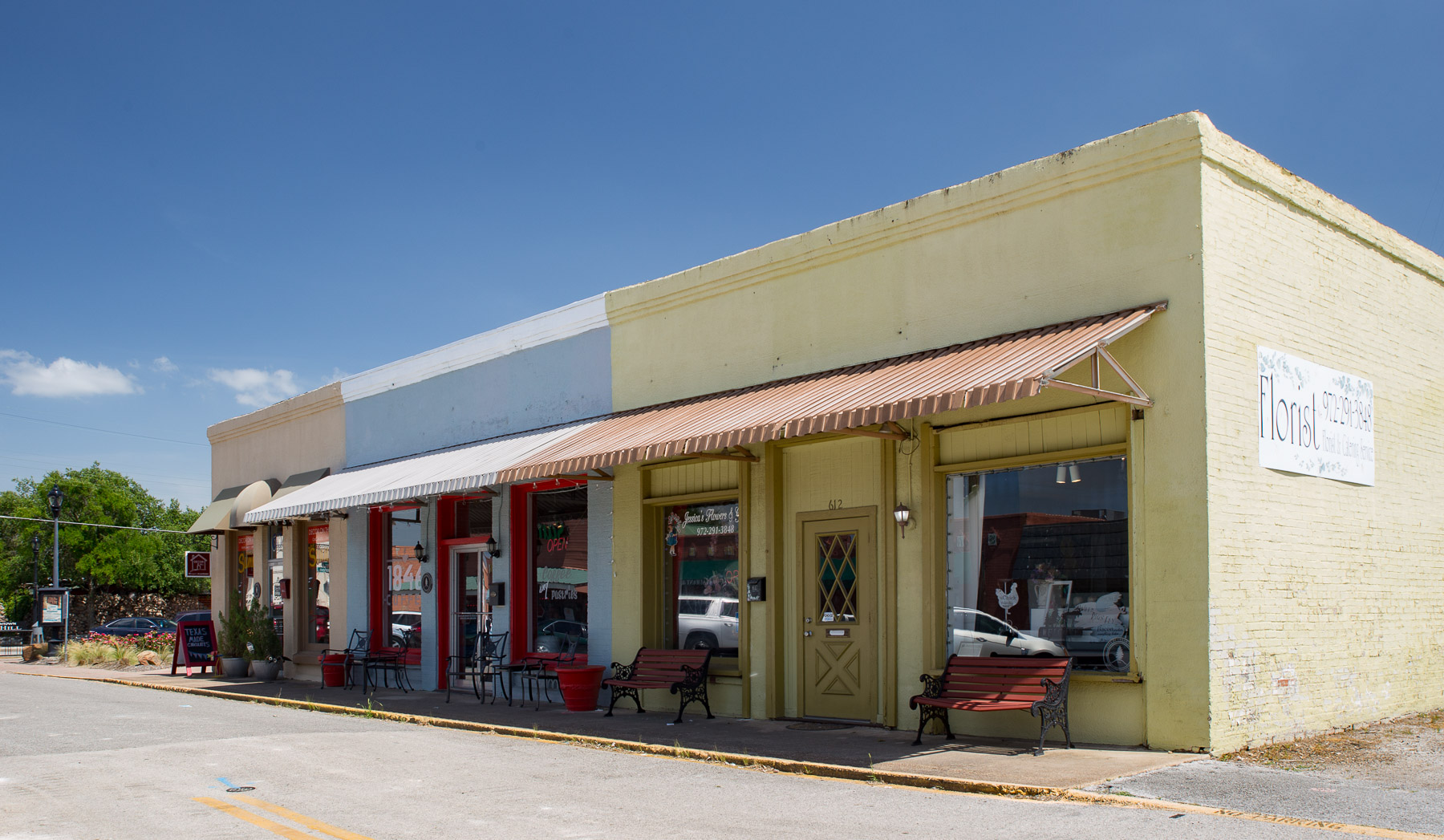
- Historic downtown Cedar Hill, Texas

- Flag
- Motto: Where Opportunities Grow Naturally
- Location of Cedar Hill in Dallas County, Texas
- Coordinates: 32°34′30″N 96°59′00″W
- Country: United States
- State: Texas
- Counties: Dallas, Ellis
- Established: 1846

Government
  - Type: Council-Manager

Area
  - Total: 35.88 sq mi (92.93 km^{2})
  - Land: 35.79 sq mi (92.69 km^{2})
  - Water: 0.093 sq mi (0.24 km^{2}) 0.26%
- Elevation: 791 ft (241 m)

Population (2020)
  - Total: 49,148
- Demonym: Cedarhillian
- Time zone: UTC-6 (CST)
  - Summer (DST): UTC-5 (CDT)
- ZIP codes: 75104, 75106
- Area codes: 214, 469, 945, 972
- FIPS code: 48-13492
- GNIS feature ID: 2409416
- Website: cedarhilltx.com

Cedar Hill is a city in Dallas and Ellis counties in the U.S. state of Texas. It is located approximately 16 miles (26 km) southwest of downtown Dallas and is situated along the eastern shore of Joe Pool Lake and Cedar Hill State Park. Per the 2020 United States census, the population was 49,148. Cedar Hill is a suburb of the city of Dallas and is part of the Best Southwest area, which includes the nearby cities of DeSoto, Duncanville, and Lancaster.

Early in its history, Cedar Hill lay along a branch of the Chisholm Trail and served as the temporary county seat of Dallas County. In 1856, a tornado swept through the town, killing nine people and destroying most of its buildings. The seat of the county was moved to Dallas not long after.

== History ==
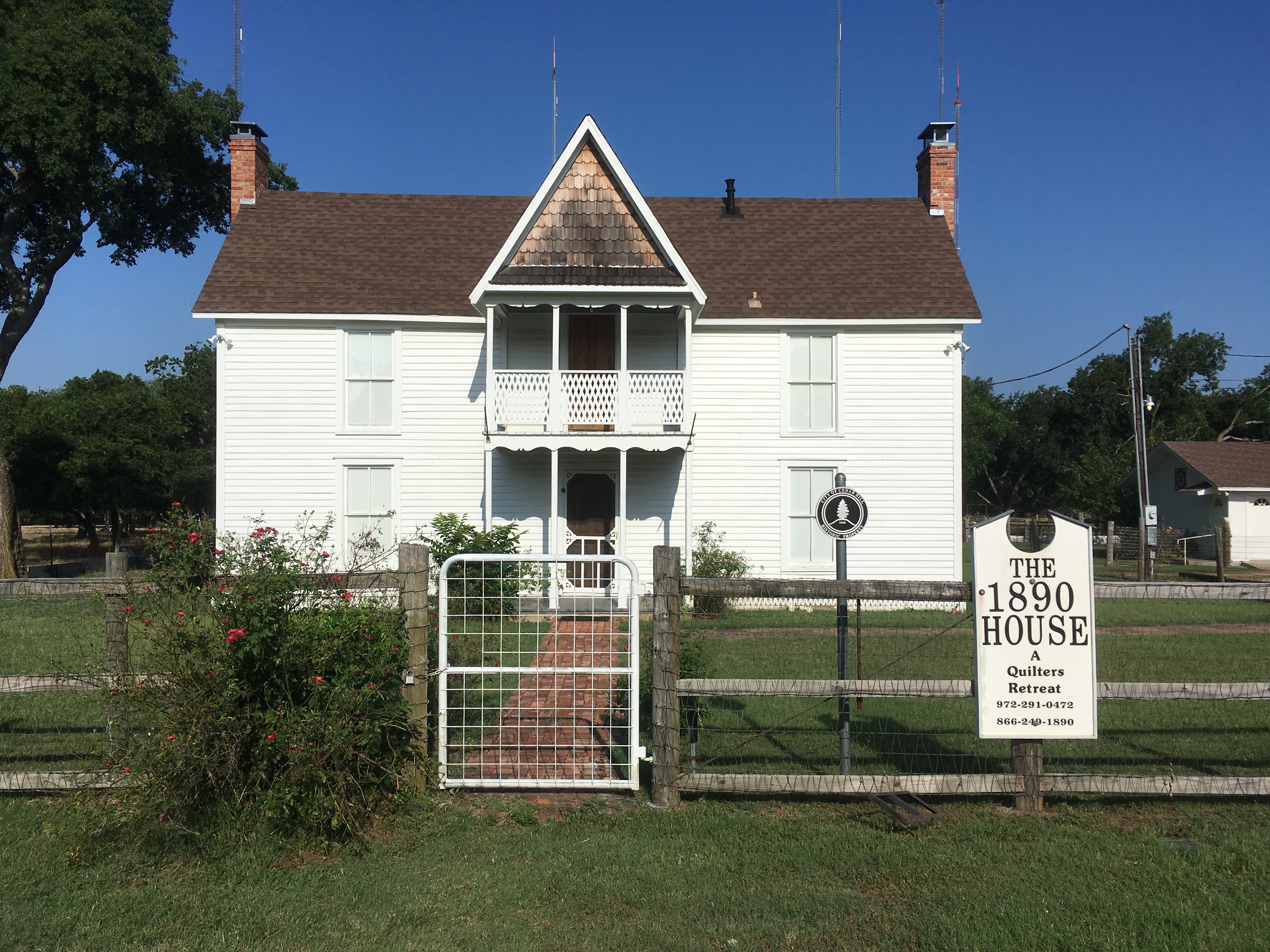
1890 home in Cedar Hill

Cedar Hill was founded circa 1846 by a small group of settlers from the Peters Colony. They came from Kentucky, Alabama, and surrounding areas to arrive in the Dallas area of North Texas; 197 families and 184 single men settled in what is now Cedar Hill, making it the largest settlement in the area at the time.

Cedar Hill has five homes listed on the National Park Service's National Register of Historic Places, four historical structures on the Texas Historical Commission's list of Recorded Texas Historic Landmarks, and two graveyards designated as "Historical Texas Cemeteries" by the Texas Historical Commission, one of which is believed to be the oldest integrated cemetery in Dallas County.

=== 1856 tornado ===
On April 29, 1856, Cedar Hill was struck by a tornado that claimed at least nine lives, damaged property, killed livestock, and reportedly left only two structures standing. Among the survivors was teacher and pastor, Robert Crawford. Crawford donated four acres of his land to church trustees to be designated as a free and indiscriminate public graveyard. Nine victims of the tornado were buried on Crawford's land.

The graveyard lay lost for about 100 years. It was rediscovered and certified by the Texas Historical Commission in 2006, and was named the Crawford Tornado Graveyard. The graveyard was reconsecrated in a blessing ceremony on October 7, 2011. The Texas Historical Commission marker was officially placed on the site on April 29, 2012, the 156th anniversary of the tornado.

=== Cedar Hill Bank robbery ===
On October 8, 1932, the then First State Bank of Cedar Hill was robbed by Raymond Hamilton, a sidekick of bank robbers Bonnie and Clyde. After taking the money, he locked the employees in the vault and made his getaway. When Hamilton got wind of reports that some of the cash had been hidden during the first robbery, he returned to rob the bank again. The consecutive robberies took a toll on the bank, causing it to fall into financial ruin and ultimately close its doors for good.

Raymond Hamilton was incarcerated at Eastham Prison in Lovelady, Texas on other charges when, on January 17, 1934, his partners, Bonnie and Clyde, broke him out of jail. The gang is known to have had an old hide out on the south edge of Cedar Hill and scattered places in the Mountain Creek Valley.

Hamilton was later re-captured on April 24, 1934. The building where the robbery took place still stands in downtown Cedar Hill. It is the current home of Cedar Hill Barbers. In March 2008, the building was designated as a historic resource by the city of Cedar Hill and bears an official medallion indicating its significance.

== Geography ==
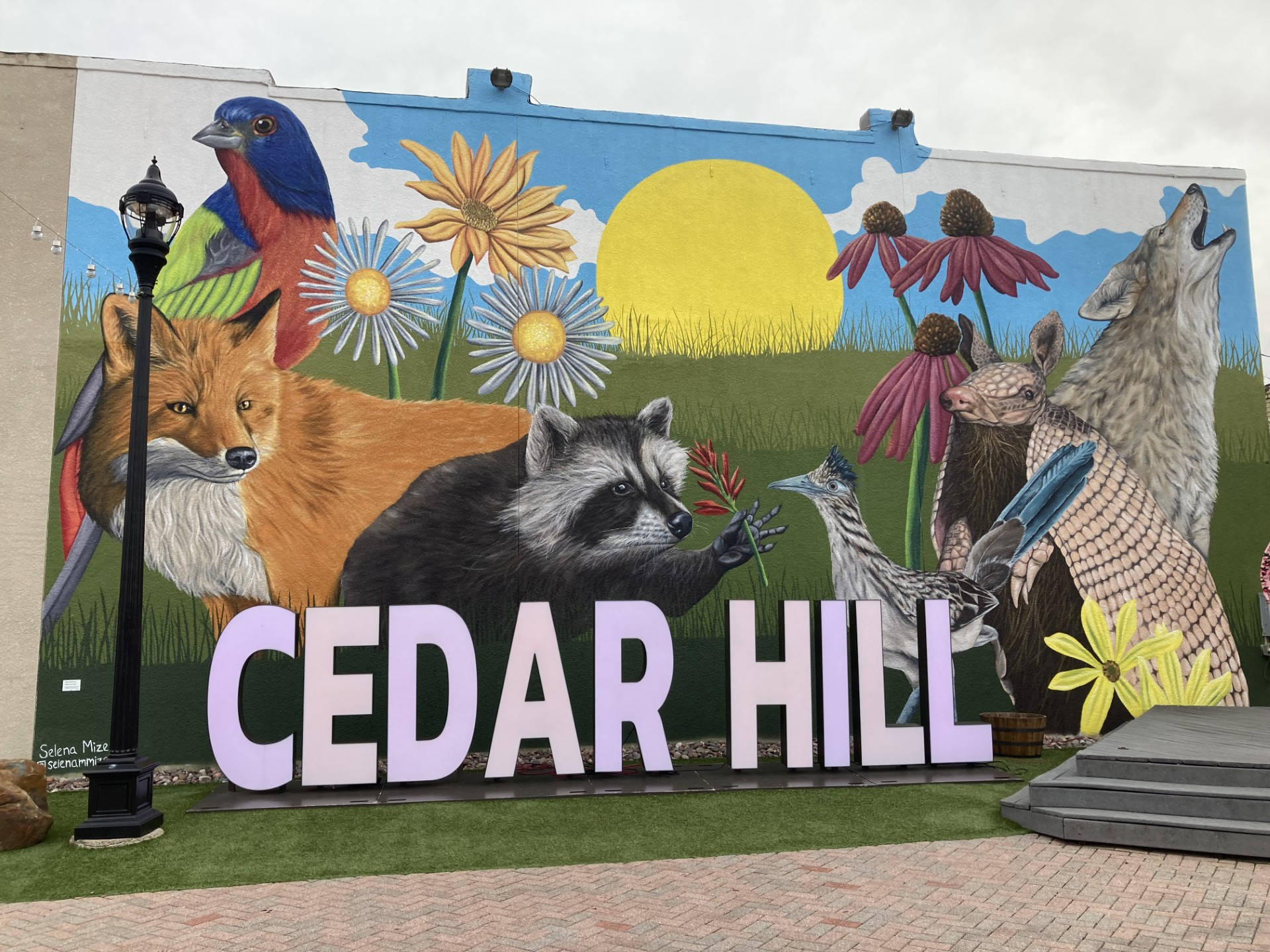
Mural of local animals in downtown Cedar Hill

Cedar Hill is located in North Texas. Adjacent cities are Grand Prairie to the southwest, west, and northwest; Dallas to the north; Duncanville to the north and northeast; DeSoto to the northeast and east; Glenn Heights and Ovilla to the southeast; and Midlothian to the south. Most of the city of Cedar Hill is in Dallas County, but a small southern section of the city spills over into Ellis County.

According to the United States Census Bureau, the city has a total area of 35.9 square miles (93.0 km^{2}), of which 35.8 square miles (92.8 km^{2}) is land and 0.08 square miles (0.2 km^{2}), or 0.26%, is water.

The city is sometimes referred to as the "hill country of Dallas" (in comparison to the "hill country" surrounding Austin and San Antonio). The city is full of native eastern red cedar evergreen trees and stands at an elevation of about 800 feet (240 m) above sea level—the highest point in a straight line from the Red River at the Texas-Oklahoma border to the Gulf Coast.

The "Austin chalk" limestone uplift on which most of Cedar Hill is spread is covered with "gumbo"-cleche-clay topsoil from a few inches to many feet. The western edge of the city, primarily the Lake Ridge neighborhood, falls below the limestone uplift on the Eagle Ford shale strata surrounding Joe Pool Lake.

== Demographics ==
Historical population
Census	Pop.	Note	%±
1940	476		—
1950	732		53.8%
1960	1,848		152.5%
1970	2,610		41.2%
1980	6,849		162.4%
1990	19,976		191.7%
2000	32,093		60.7%
2010	45,028		40.3%
2020	49,148		9.1%
2024 (est.)	49,618		1.0%
U.S. Decennial Census; 2010 2020

From the 1950 United States census-tabulated population of 732, to 2000's 32,093 people, the city of Cedar Hill has experienced positive growth trends as a suburban community of Dallas. According to the 2020 U.S. census, Cedar Hill's population grew to 49,148.

=== Racial and ethnic composition ===
Cedar Hill city, Texas – Racial and ethnic composition Note: the US Census treats Hispanic/Latino as an ethnic category. This table excludes Latinos from the racial categories and assigns them to a separate category. Hispanics/Latinos may be of any race.
Race / Ethnicity (NH = Non-Hispanic)	Pop 2000	Pop 2010	% 2020	% 2000	% 2010	% 2020
White alone (NH)	16,317	11,604	8,646	50.84%	25.77%	17.59%
Black or African American alone (NH)	10,727	23,146	25,790	33.42%	51.40%	52.47%
Native American or Alaska Native alone (NH)	113	134	157	0.35%	0.30%	0.32%
Asian alone (NH)	627	893	1,035	1.95%	1.98%	2.11%
Native Hawaiian or Pacific Islander alone (NH)	16	18	22	0.05%	0.04%	0.04%
Other race alone (NH)	31	63	200	0.10%	0.14%	0.41%
Mixed race or Multiracial (NH)	440	765	1,417	1.37%	1.70%	2.88%
Hispanic or Latino (any race)	3,822	8,405	11,881	11.91%	18.67%	24.17%
Total	32,093	45,028	49,148	100.00%	100.00%	100.00%

=== 2020 census ===
As of the 2020 census, Cedar Hill had a population of 49,148. The median age was 36.9 years. 26.0% of residents were under the age of 18 and 12.1% of residents were 65 years of age or older. For every 100 females there were 88.1 males, and for every 100 females age 18 and over there were 82.4 males age 18 and over.

95.2% of residents lived in urban areas, while 4.8% lived in rural areas.

There were 16,592 households in Cedar Hill, of which 40.1% had children under the age of 18 living in them. Of all households, 49.0% were married-couple households, 13.5% were households with a male householder and no spouse or partner present, and 32.6% were households with a female householder and no spouse or partner present. About 19.4% of all households were made up of individuals and 7.1% had someone living alone who was 65 years of age or older.

There were 17,193 housing units, of which 3.5% were vacant. Among occupied housing units, 69.4% were owner-occupied and 30.6% were renter-occupied. The homeowner vacancy rate was 0.9% and the rental vacancy rate was 5.7%.

The 2020 American Community Survey estimated a median household income of $75,715.

=== 2000 census ===
In 2000 the racial makeup of the city was 56.67% White, 33.61% African American, 0.50% Native American, 1.98% Asian, 0.05% Pacific Islander, 4.87% from other races, and 2.32% from two or more races. Hispanic or Latinos of any race were 11.91% of the population.

The median income as of the 2000 census for a household in the city was $60,136, and the median income for a family was $63,416. Males had a median income of $41,360 versus $32,207 for females. The per capita income for the city was $23,389. About 4.2% of families and 5.5% of the population were below the poverty line, including 7.7% of those under age 18 and 6.5% of those age 65 or over.

== Economy ==
In the early 1990s, the population of Cedar Hill was increasing rapidly and citizens began to be concerned about the need for orderly economic development. An economic development advisory committee was formed by the city council that surveyed the residents to see how they envisioned Cedar Hill's future. Based on the response, subcommittees were formed to look into funding, asset enhancement, and community image.

In January 1994 voters approved a special sales tax to fund the economic development efforts, and the Cedar Hill EDC was incorporated in September 1994. They began with an annual budget of $150,000, and have increased it to $3.5 million with their development efforts. The economic development corporation has been a huge proponent in development activity in the City, assisting with recruiting and retaining businesses.

Since 2000, the city has added several retail outlets. The opening of The Plaza at Cedar Hill, in the fall of 2000, began the growth. This 260,000 sq ft (24,000 m^{2}) retail center included a variety of large and small stores. Later that year, The Cedar Hill Crossing was built. A few years later, in 2003, Cedar Village, 70-acre (280,000 m^{2}), was built to include linking a new city hall and historic Main Street district to retail, residential, office and entertainment developments. The Village includes retail frontage along US Hwy 67, restaurants, stores and office space. The Pleasant Run Towne Crossing was built in 2003 with 409,000 sq ft (38,000 m^{2}) of retail and restaurants. A couple of years later, Cedar Hill Pointe was built, which opened in 2005. Hillside Village (formerly Uptown Village at Cedar Hill), Cedar Hill's upscale lifestyle center, opened in March 2008. The 615,000-square-foot (57,100 m^{2}) lifestyle shopping center includes three anchor stores, 65 additional stores, and numerous restaurants. Hillside Village is bound by Highway 67 to the east, FM 1382 on the south, Pleasant Run Road on the north, and Cedar Hill Road on the west.

The Uptown Village development was awarded the 2006 Best Real Estate Deal in Retail/Hospitality by Dallas Business Journal. Trademark Property Co. acquired the Uptown Village property in 2015 which brought multimillion-dollar renovations including first phase: new children's play area, new promenade section with a bocce ball court, a covered stage area, and enhanced outdoor elements to increase the shopping experience at the lifestyle center. The new name and corresponding new brand were selected to reflect the garden-like look and feel planned in the multimillion-dollar property renovation as well as paying homage to the community in which it lies.

The City worked with citizens on developing a long-range plan called City Center Vision Plan. The plan is a specific area plan dedicated to transforming Cedar Hill's City Center into a walkable, mixed-use destination that will have a sense of place. City Center consists of 3 sub districts referred to as Uptown, Midtown and Historic Downtown. City Council adopted the City Center Development Plan in October 2014, the implementation of this plan is fully underway. Implementation of the Plan has four components: Regulation Actions, Economic/Financing Strategies, Communication/Marketing and Projects. In 2014, a $26 million project was developed in Midtown area. Midtown Apartments is a 255-unit, 3-apartment story complex that lies within the City Center area plan providing residents direct access to outdoor recreation activities, retail and restaurants. The development was recognized in 2014 as Best Real Estate Deal in Multifamily Deal by Dallas Business Journal.

== Education ==
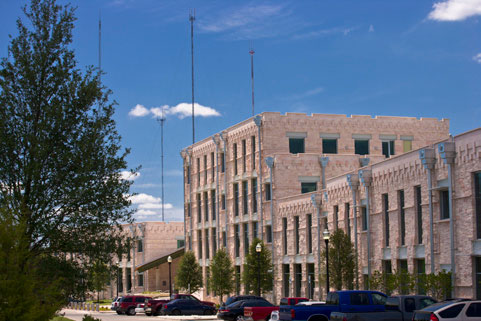
The Cedar Hill Government Center, which houses the Cedar Hill ISD offices

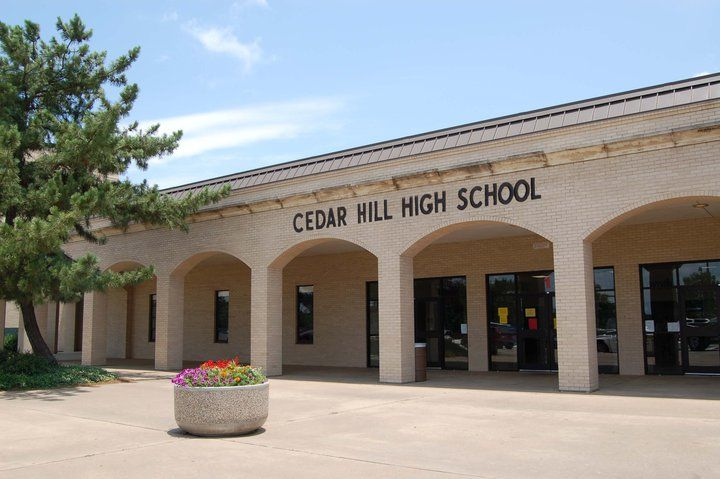
Cedar Hill High School

Most of the city is served by the Cedar Hill Independent School District. Some of it is served by Duncanville Independent School District and the Midlothian Independent School District.

The Cedar Hill ISD portion is served by Cedar Hill High School and Cedar Hill Collegiate High School. The Duncanville ISD portion is served by Duncanville High School. The Midlothian ISD portion is served by Midlothian Heritage High School. Life School, a public charter school, operates the K–4 Cedar Hill campus. Additionally, Trinity Christian School – Cedar Hill (affiliated with a local Assemblies of God church) also serves the area.

Dallas County residents are zoned to Dallas College (formerly Dallas County Community College or DCCCD). Portions in Ellis County are zoned to Navarro College.

== Arts and culture ==
=== Nature ===
Cedar Hill has set aside 20% of its land for parks and green space. 3,000 acres of nature reserves and preserves are located in Cedar Hill including Dogwood Canyon and Cedar Hill State Park.

==== Dogwood Canyon ====
Dogwood Canyon was formed by the convergence of two ecosystems: the Blackland Prairie, which covers the majority of Dallas County, and the white rock of the Austin Chalk deposits.

Wildlife living in the canyon include birds such as the painted bunting, black-capped vireo, and golden-cheeked warbler, the latter two of which are endangered. Wildlife species include bobcats, coyotes, lizards, and snakes.

The canyon is named for the flowering Dogwoods found throughout the escarpment. Other plant life found in Dogwood Canyon include the White trout-lily as well as three species of Hexalectris orchids, which are among only a few hundred in the country.

==== Cedar Hill State Park ====
Cedar Hill State Park opened in 1991, and is located on the northeast corner of Joe Pool Lake. The park consists of 1,826 acres of land and miles of shoreline. The area is a transition zone between the rolling tallgrass prairie with its black clay soil and the rugged limestone escarpment.

The park considers the native tallgrass prairie remnants to be its most important natural feature. In the early 1800s a vast tallgrass prairie stretched from Texas to Canada. Today, less than one percent survives. These endangered remnants include Indian grass, little bluestem, big bluestem, sideoats grama, and switchgrass. The park has reintroduced Eastern gamma grass and meadow pinks in selected areas.

In the wooded hills of the park, common animals include bobcats, coyotes, foxes, squirrels, armadillos, and raccoons. Lake fishing is good for largemouth bass, white bass, crappie, and catfish.

The Cedar Hill State Park has approximately 200 species of birds and is home to many other Neotropical migrants. The most sought after bird at the park is the painted bunting, common from May through August.

==== Joe Pool Lake ====
Cedar Hill rests on the edge of Joe Pool Lake. The lake was impounded in 1986, has a surface area of 6,469 acres and a maximum depth of 75 feet. Joe Pool Lake can be accessed through the Cedar Hill State Park or any other of the three parks located along its borders.

=== Sports ===
Cedar Hill hosts local, regional, and national sports tournaments. Cedar Hill's sports complexes collectively include 21 baseball and softball fields, 18 soccer pitches, 7 basketball courts, 6 tennis courts, 4 football fields, and a 36-hole disc golf course.

=== Points of interest ===
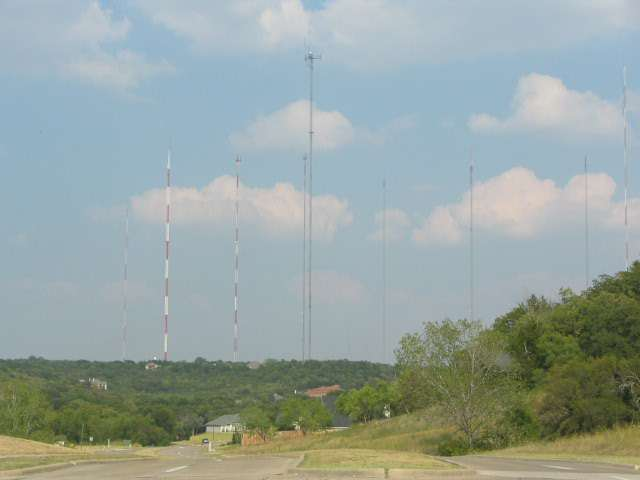
Antenna grouping in Cedar Hill

==== Towers ====
In the 1950s, Cedar Hill became home to what was then known as Hill Tower. At 880 feet above sea level, Cedar Hill's elevation made it a desirable location for installation of television and FM broadcast transmitting towers which would equally cover both Fort Worth and Dallas. Hill Tower was the first single tower owned and operated by two television stations at the same time.

Because of its elevation, many local radio and TV stations have their antennas located there. Pulse-Doppler weather radar equipment for tracking tornadoes are also attached to these steel antenna masts that reach several thousand feet into the air.

During this time, then CBS affiliate, KRLD-TV (now Fox affiliate KDFW), and ABC affiliate WFAA-TV, were the leading television stations of Dallas. Both stations were in competition for the same location, thus the idea of Hill Tower was born. The tower would reach over 1,500 feet into the sky and be topped with an 80-foot triangular platform consisting of two antennas, one for each station. Dubbed 'the candelabra', both antennas were of equal height and equal centers of radiation. Eventually, NBC affiliate WBAP-TV (now KXAS-TV) moved to Cedar Hill, though against the wishes of Fort Worth civic booster and Star-Telegram publisher Amon G. Carter and his heirs, who tried to argue against a united Dallas–Fort Worth media market despite the realities of broadcasting.

Since the construction of Hill Tower, many other local television and radio stations have located here, and more recently, mobile communications technology service providers. Today, Cedar Hill has the highest concentration of radio and television communication antennas in the county with 14 towers.

Visible from 20 miles away on a clear night, the towers have become a landmark for travelers. They also serve as a navigational landmark for aircraft pilots who use the towers as a guide.

==== Penn Farm Agricultural History Center ====
Farmers such as John Wesley Penn utilized the natural resources of the land to build farms and provided shelter and sustenance for their families. The Penn family lived and grazed livestock on the native prairie grasses for over a hundred years. During that time, most of the tallgrass prairie in Dallas County vanished – plowed under and replaced with crops of wheat or cotton. Perhaps because of the rocky surface and hilly terrain of the Cedar Hill area, the prairie remnants at Penn Farm survived and are maintained today.

Penn Farm Agricultural History Center was created from the remnants of Penn Farm, which date back to the 1850s. The center is located within Cedar Hill State Park. It was designed to educate people about early life in Cedar Hill and to demonstrate how human invention rendered the greatest impact on the tallgrass prairie once prominent in this area. Many of the original structures still remain standing, showing the evolution of machinery constructed and adapted by the Penn family as needs changed and modern conveniences were added.

==== Dogwood Canyon Audubon Center ====
Dogwood Canyon Audubon Center was built as a partnership between Cedar Hill and the National Audubon Society. On April 23, 2008, John Flicker, former president of the National Audubon Society, led the groundbreaking ceremonies for the Dogwood Canyon Audubon Center. The Center officially opened in 2011.

The visitor center has been awarded Leadership in Energy and Environmental Design (LEED) Gold Certification, established by the U.S. Green Building Council and verified by the Green Building Certification Institute (GBCI), for energy use, lighting, water, and material use as well as incorporating a variety of other sustainable strategies.

In 2015, Dogwood Canyon Audubon Center partnered with the Cedar Hill Independent School District on a study linking outdoor science education to academic performance. The study involved 500 5th grade students from Cedar Hill ISD. The students participated weekly in the Audubon Center's customized Eco Investigations lessons. Those who participated scored 20% higher on related STAAR questions then nonparticipants. This study is the first of its kind in Texas.

== Recreation ==
=== Parks ===
Cedar Hill manages and maintains 32 park properties including 6 community parks, 17 neighborhood parks, 1 special purpose park, 3 nature preserves, and 4 greenbelts.

=== Hike and bike ===
Cedar Hill currently has over 45 miles of multi-purpose, integrated trails and bikeways. Most recent additions include Pleasant Run Trail, Lake Ridge Hike and Bike Trail, and Red Oak Creek Trail.

DORBA Trail is the longest trail located in Cedar Hill State Park and is a shared use hike and bike trail. The trail was created through the efforts of the Dallas Off-Road Bicycle Association, hence the trail name, and the Cedar Hill State Park management. It is considered one of the top mountain biking trails in the state.

An ADA accessible trail can be found at the Dogwood Canyon Audubon Center.

A number of creeks are located around the state park, including Baggett Branch.
