= Cedar Hill Independent School District =

School district in Texas

Location
- Cedar Hill, Texas United States

District information
- Type: Public
- Superintendent: Maria Gamell (2025 – present)
- Governing agency: Texas Education Agency

Students and staff
- Students: 6,336 (2023–24)
- Teachers: 430.90 (on an FTE basis)
- Student–teacher ratio: 14.70

Other information
- Website: http://www.chisd.net/

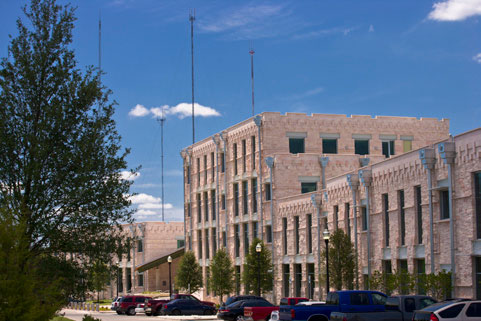
The Cedar Hill Government Center

Cedar Hill Independent School District (CHISD) is a public school district based in Cedar Hill, Texas, United States. The district superintendent is Maria Gamell.

== Area, demographics, and history ==
Cedar Hill ISD serves 36 square miles – most of the city of Cedar Hill and portions of Grand Prairie, Ovilla, Duncanville, and Dallas.

CHISD has 61 buses and 2,270 daily bus riders.

Cedar Hill ISD was established in 1904, with just one campus, when it enacted a special school tax per new law. The district counted 273 students in 1922–23. In the 1930s, the first Parent Teacher's Association was organized, and Mrs. Haswell was the first president. Bray Elementary was CHISD's original elementary-school campus. It was named in honor of Ms. Floy Bray (1889–1985). The current Cedar Hill High School was built in 1978.

The student ethnic composition was 66.14% African American, 24.64% Hispanic, 4.02% White, 3.7% two or more races, 1.13% Asian, 0.27% American Indian, and 0.09% Native Hawaiian/Pacific Islander; 17 languages are represented at CHISD.

== Academic standards ==
In 2025, the school district was rated C by the Texas Education Agency.

Below are the 2025 TEA ratings for the individual campuses.

== Schools ==
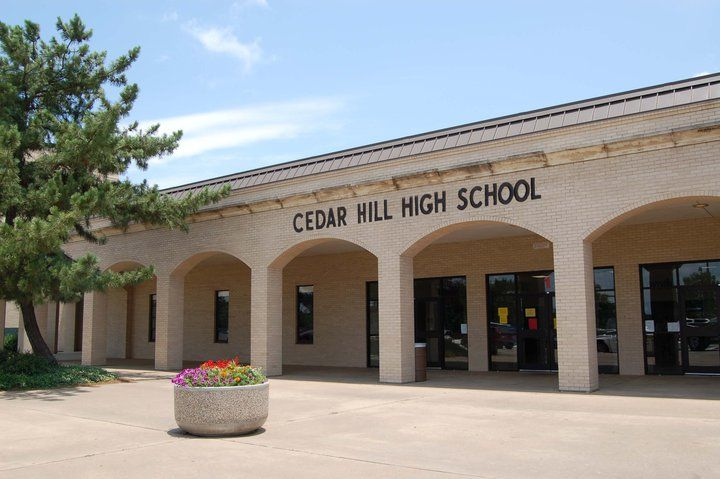
Cedar Hill High School

=== High schools ===
- Cedar Hill High School - C
- Cedar Hill Collegiate High School opened in 2008 – A

=== Middle schools ===
- W.S. Permenter Middle School opened in 1989 and was named in honor of former CHISD Superintendent W.S. Permenter (1928–2007) - C
- Bessie Coleman Middle School opened in 2005 and was named in honor of Bessie Coleman (1892–1926), the first woman of African American and Native American descent to have a pilot license - D
- Cedar Hill Collegiate Academy – A

=== Elementary schools ===
- Collegiate Prep Elementary – A
- Highlands Elementary School home to the CHISD Elementary Bilingual Program - B
- High Pointe Elementary School opened in 1986, with renovations in 2001–02 - C
- Lake Ridge Elementary School opened in 2002, the newest elementary campus in CHISD - C
- Plummer Elementary School opened in 1973 as South Hills Elementary and renamed in 1980 in honor of Rosa Belle Plummer (1914–2005), who taught at Bray Elementary 1935-1980 - D
- Waterford Oaks Elementary School opened in 1990 and renovated in 2001–02 - D
