= East Central Texas forests =

Temperate broadleaf and mixed forests ecoregion of Oklahoma and Texas, United States

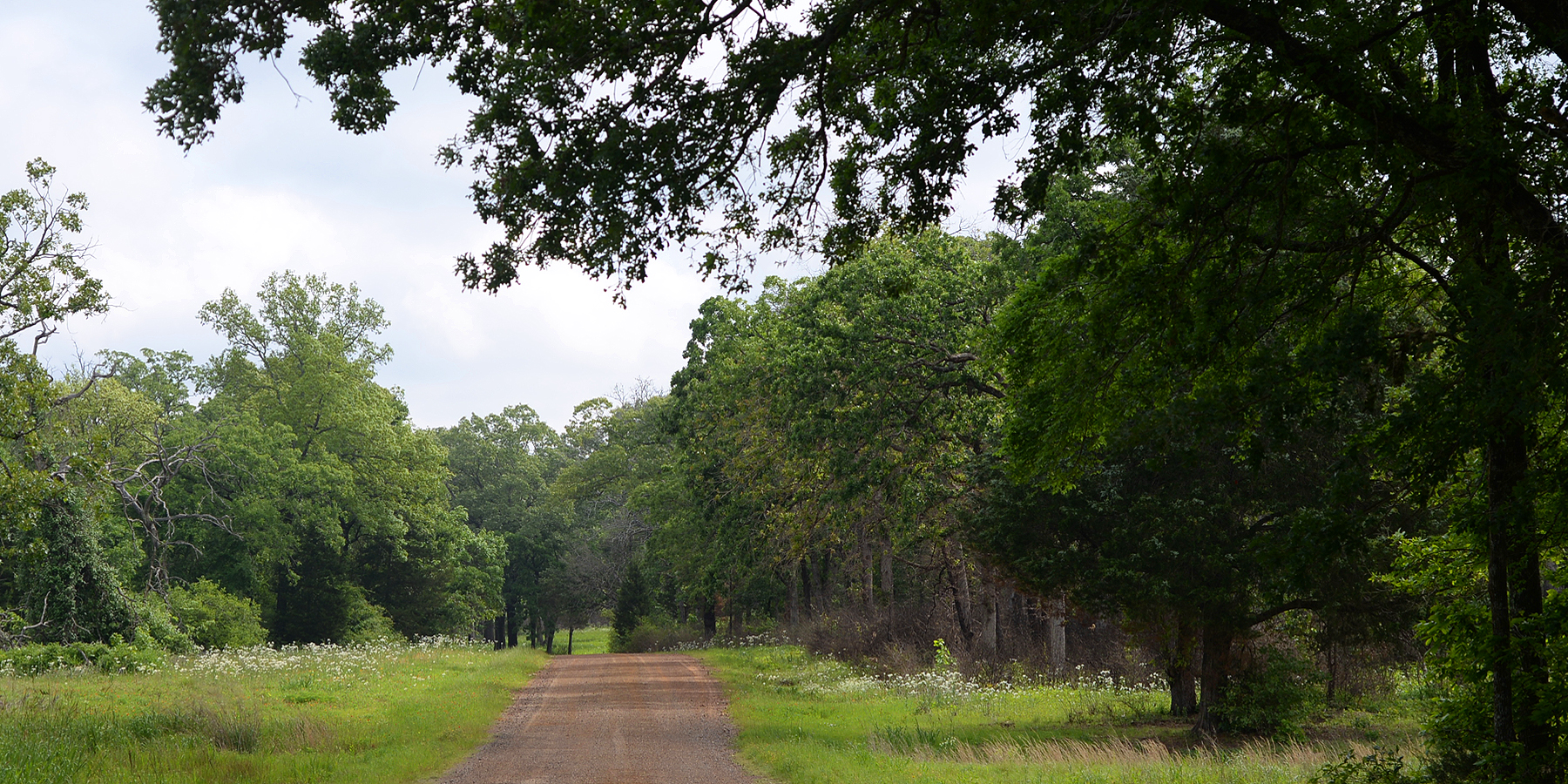
- Northern Post Oak savanna, Gus Engeling Wildlife Management Area

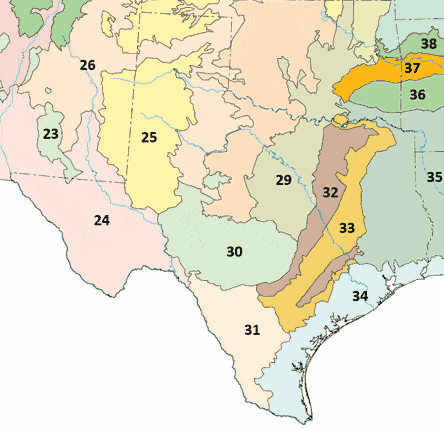
- East Central Texas forests (33)

Ecology
- Realm: Nearctic
- Biome: Temperate broadleaf and mixed forests
- Borders: List: Texas Blackland Prairies (32); South Central Plains (35); Western Gulf Coastal Plain (34); Southern Texas Plains (31); Cross Timbers (29)

Geography
- Area: 52,600 km^{2} (20,300 mi^{2})
- Country: United States
- States: Oklahoma; Texas
- Climate type: Humid subtropical (Cfa)

Conservation
- Conservation status: Critical/endangered
- Habitat loss: 75%

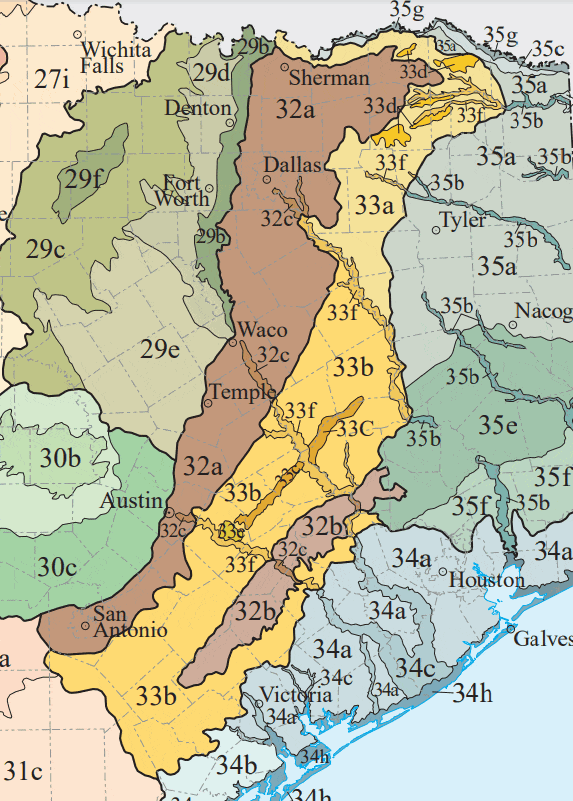
Map of the East Central Texas forests 33 and adjacent ecoregions. Sub-ecoregions include: Northern Post Oak Savanna 33a Southern Post Oak Savanna 33b San Antonio Prairie 33c Northern Prairie Outliers 33d Bastrop Lost Pines 33e Floodplains and Low Terraces 33f

The East Central Texas forests or East Central Texas Plains (33) form a small temperate broadleaf and mixed forests ecoregion almost entirely within the state of Texas, United States. The northern forest perimeter is partially within the southeast Oklahoma border. The ecoregion is dominated by the Post Oak Savanna.

== Description ==
East Central Texas forests are distinguished from the adjacent Texas blackland prairies and Western Gulf coastal grasslands by their greater tree density. They also are more open and have a greater concentration of hardwoods than the forests of the Piney Woods. The climate is hot and humid.

== Subregions ==
=== Post Oak Savanna ===
The Post Oak Savanna subregions take up most of the area of this ecoregion. Although the savanna receives 35 to 45 inches of precipitation as annual average, many areas look somewhat arid due to a claypan subsoil. Post oak and blackjack oak are most common, and the region's other oak species include southern red oak, bur oak, and chinkapin oak. Black hickory is abundant here and there; cedar elm, common persimmon, sugarberry and eastern red cedar are also conspicuous. As a transitional area between piney woods to the east and prairie to the west, the savanna hosts species from a variety of moisture regimens. Loblolly pine, wooly birch, and red maple range in from more humid eastern regions, and even peat bogs occur. Plants characteristic of arid sites include honey mesquite, prickly pear cactus, and two species of yucca.

==== Northern Post Oak Savanna ====
The landscapes of this ecoregion are generally more level and gently rolling compared to the more dissected and irregular topography of much of Southern Post Oak Savanna. It is underlain by mostly Eocene- and Paleocene-age formations with some Cretaceous rocks to the north. Prairie openings contained little bluestem and other grasses and forbs. The land cover currently has more improved pasture and less post oak woods and forest than the Southern Post Oak Savanna. Some coniferous trees occur, especially on the transitional boundary with the Tertiary Uplands ecoregion. Loblolly pine has been planted in several areas. Typical wildlife species include white-tailed deer, eastern wild turkey, northern bobwhite, eastern fox squirrel, and eastern gray squirrel.

==== Southern Post Oak Savanna ====
This ecoregion has more woods and forest than the adjacent prairie ecoregions, and consists of mostly hardwoods compared to the pines to the east in the South Central Plains. Historically a post oak savanna, current land cover is a mix of post oak woods, improved pasture, and rangeland, with some invasive mesquite to the south. A thick understory of yaupon and eastern redcedar occurs in some parts. The ecoregion is underlain by Miocene, Oligocene, Eocene, and Paleocene sediments. Sand exposures within these Tertiary deposits have a distinctive sandyland flora, and in a few areas unique bogs occur. The endangered Houston Toad is associated with the deep sandy soils of this ecoregion.

=== San Antonio Prairie ===
This ecoregion is a narrow, 100-mile-long region occurring primarily on the Eocene Cook Mountain Formation. Upland Alfisol prairies were dominated by little bluestem and yellow indiangrass and contained a different mix of grasses and forbs than the dark, clayey, more calcareous soils of the Northern Texas blackland prairies. Since the 1830s, settlement clustered along the Old San Antonio Road (Texas State Highway 21 in the south, Old San Antonio Road in the north) within this narrow belt of prairie land. Currently, land cover is a mosaic of woodland, improved pasture, rangeland, and some cropland.

=== Northern Prairie Outliers ===
The small, disjunct areas of this ecoregion have a blend of characteristics from the Texas blackland prairies and the East Central Texas forests. The northern two outliers, north of the Sulphur River, occur on Cretaceous sediments, while south of the river, Paleocene and Eocene formations predominate. A mosaic of forest and prairie occurred historically in this and adjacent regions. Burning was important in maintaining grassy openings, and woody invasions have taken place in the absence of fire. The tallgrass prairies included little bluestem, big bluestem, yellow indiangrass, and tall dropseed. Current land cover is mostly pasture, with some cropland.

=== Bastrop Lost Pines ===
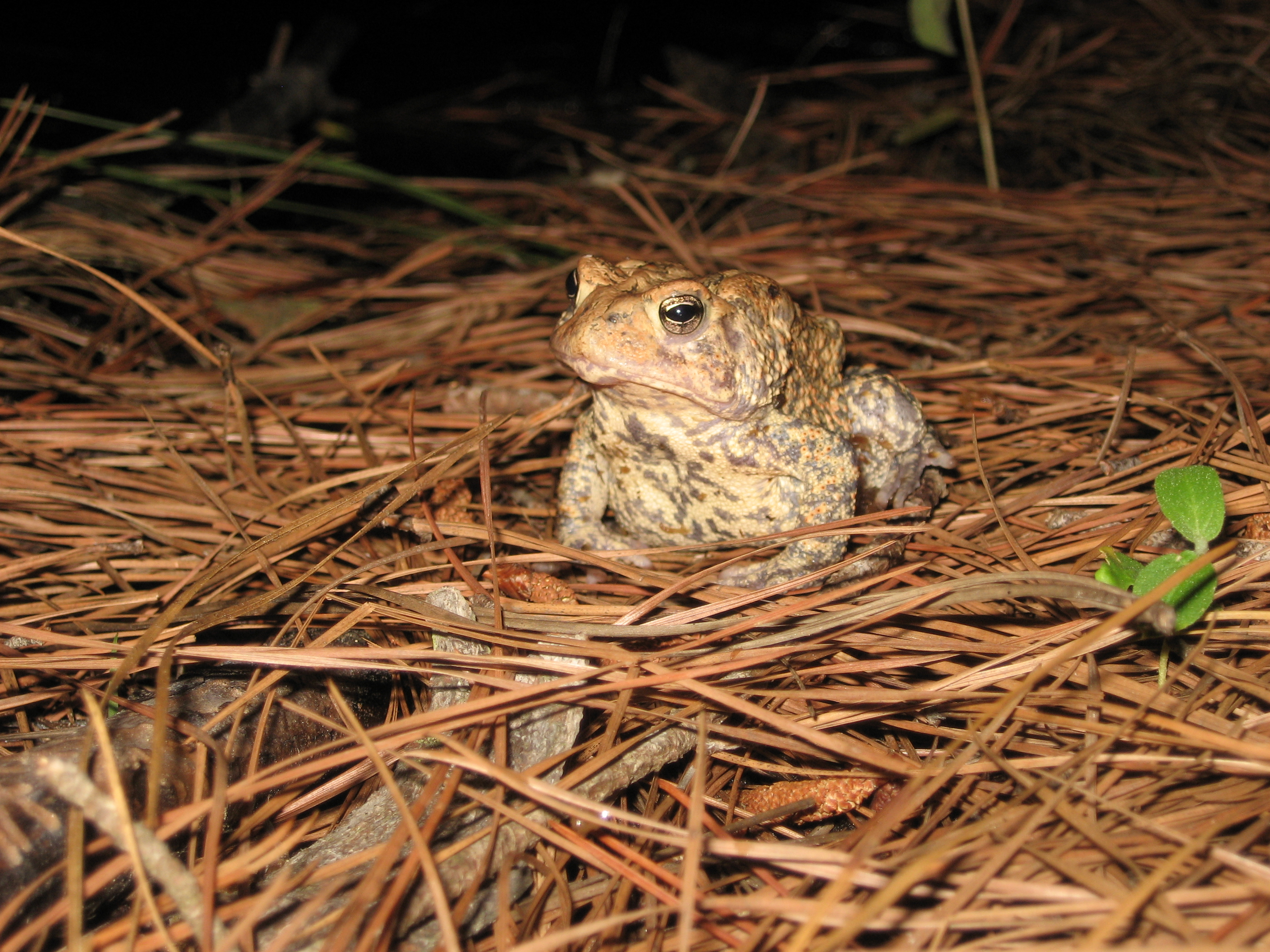
The Houston Toad (Anaxyrus houstonensis) is an endangered species occurring in the East Central Texas forests.

This ecoregion is an outlier of relict loblolly pine-post oak upland forest occurring on some dissected hills. It is the westernmost tract of southern pine in the United States. The pines mostly occur on gravelly soils that formed in Pleistocene high gravel, fluvial terrace deposits associated with the ancestral Colorado River, and sandy soils that formed in Eocene sandstones (such as the Weches Formation). The Lost Pines are about 100 miles (160 km) west of the Texas pine belt of the South Central Plains and occur in a drier environment with 36 inches (910 mm) of average annual precipitation. In this area, the deep, acidic, sandy soils and the additional moisture provided by the Colorado River contribute to the occurrence of pines, which are thought to be a relict population antedating the last glacial period. The largest population of the Houston toad occurs in this ecoregion.

=== Floodplains and low terraces ===
This ecoregion contains floodplain and low terrace deposits downstream from the Texas blackland prairies and upstream from the Texas coastal plains. It includes only the wider floodplains of major streams, such as the Sulphur, Trinity, Brazos, and Colorado Rivers. In addition, it covers primarily Holocene deposits and not Pleistocene deposits on older, high terraces. The bottomland forests contain water oak, post oak, elms, green ash, pecan, willow oak, and bald cypress to the east, and to the west some hackberry and eastern cottonwoods. The northern floodplains tend to have more forested land cover, while in the south the Brazos and Colorado River floodplains are characterized by more cropland and pasture.

== Fauna ==
The forests are home to a rich wildlife including Virginia opossums (Didelphis virginiana), North American least shrews (Cryptotis parva), North American beavers (Castor canadensis), and many species of butterflies and reptiles. Larger mammals that once lived here, including jaguar (Panthera onca) and Plains bison (Bison bison bison), have now disappeared from the region. Endangered fauna found in this ecoregion include the Houston toad (Bufo houstonensis) and Attwater's prairie chickens (Tympanuchus cupido attwateri).

== Conservation ==
This environment has been heavily altered by cattle ranching and clearing for farmland with only a quarter of the original habitats remaining, in fragmented patches, not in large blocks. No national forests are in the region.

== Gallery ==
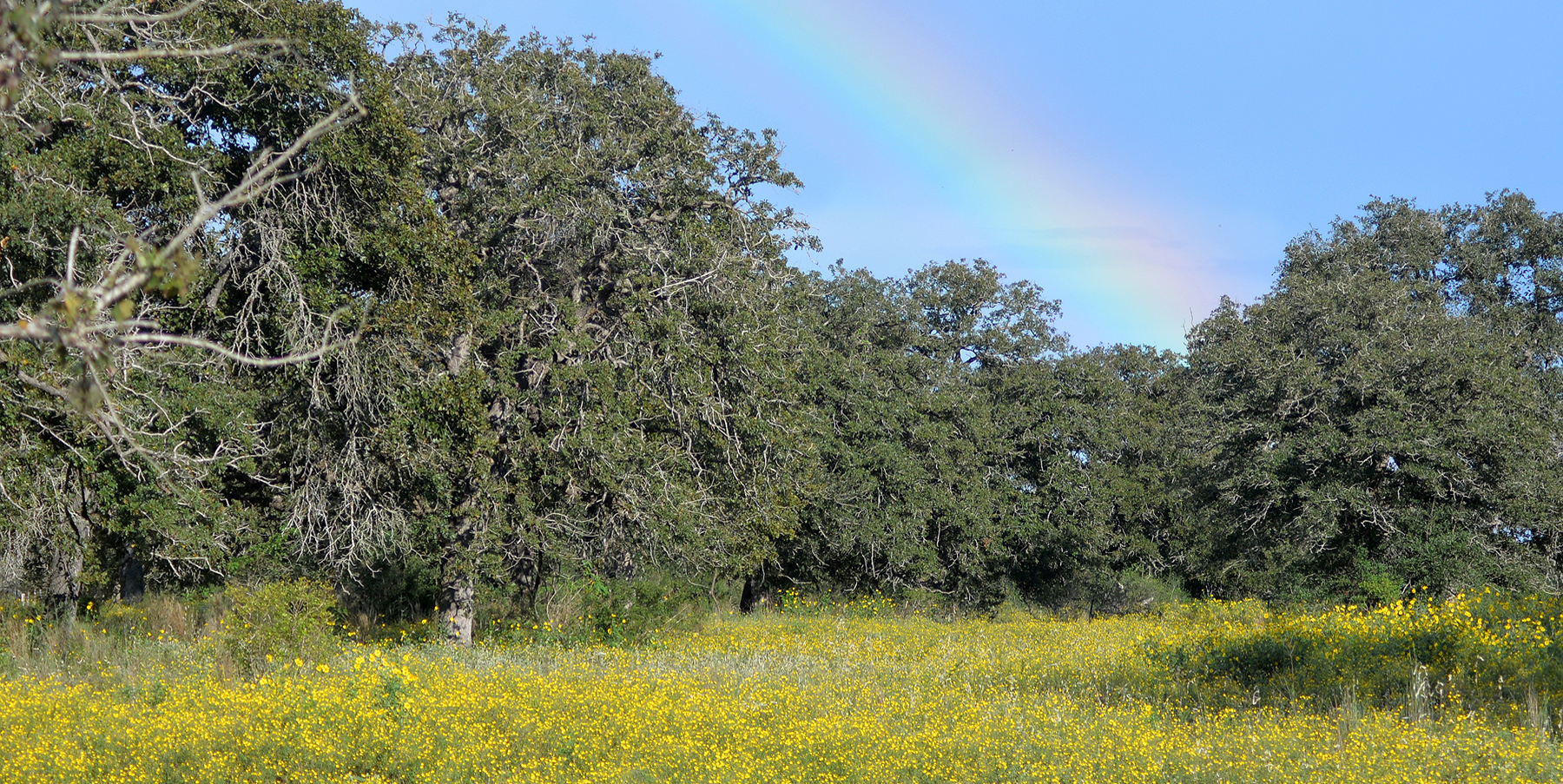
Oaks trees (Quercus) and wildflowers, Guadalupe County (October 2018).

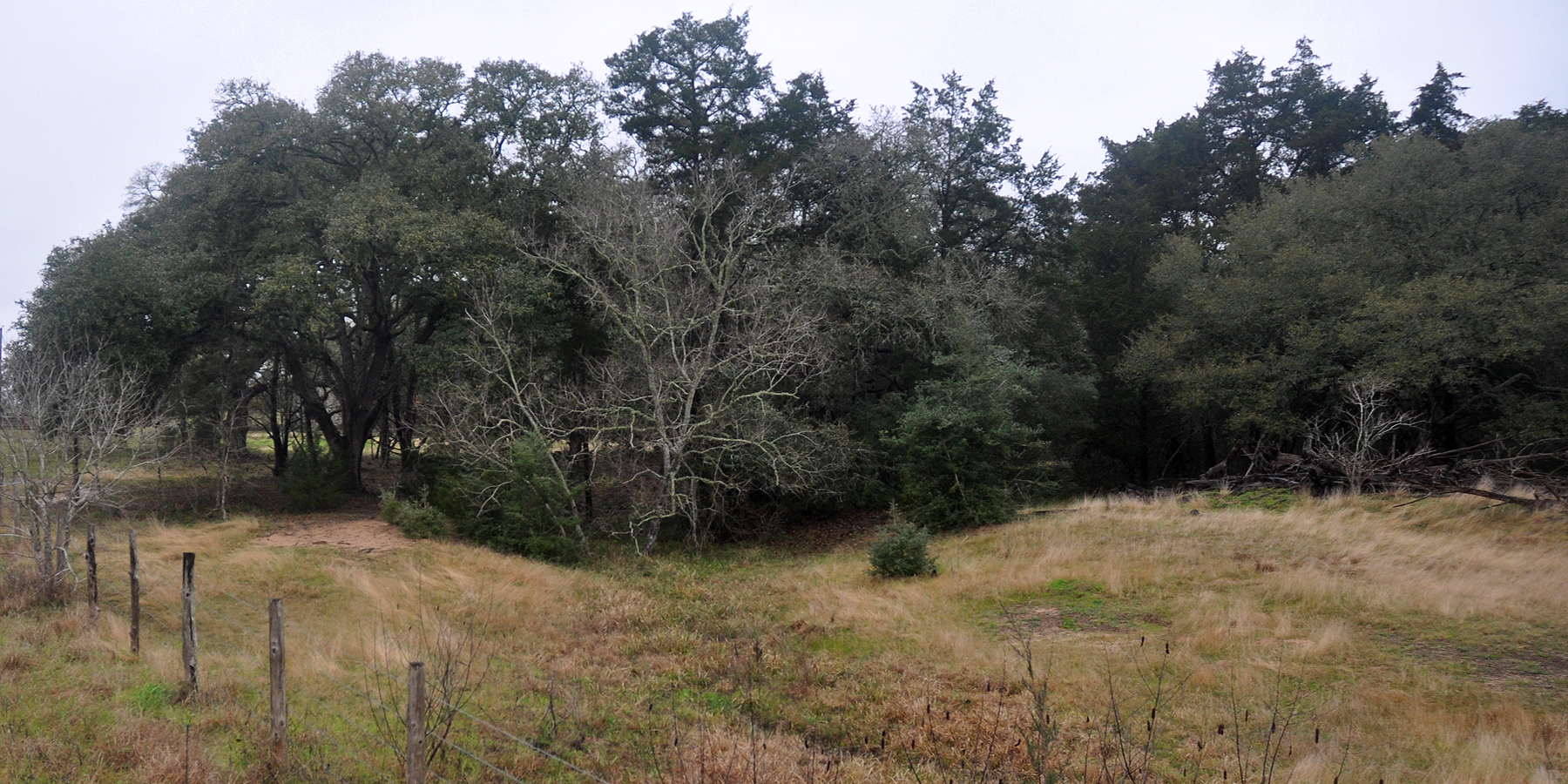
Southern Post Oak Savannah habitat, Austin County, (March 2014).

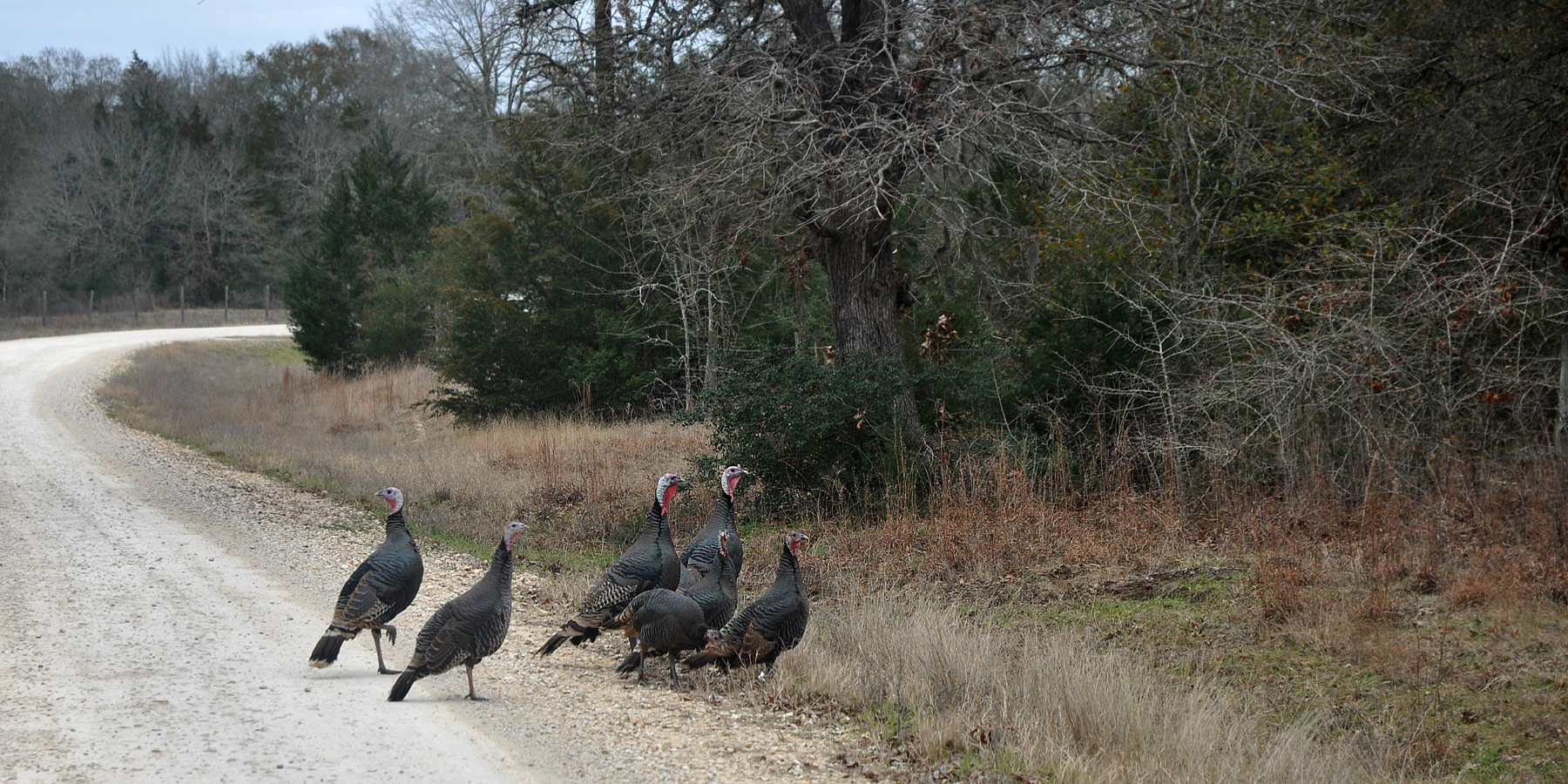
Wild Turkey (Meleagris gallopavo), Austin County (January 2014).

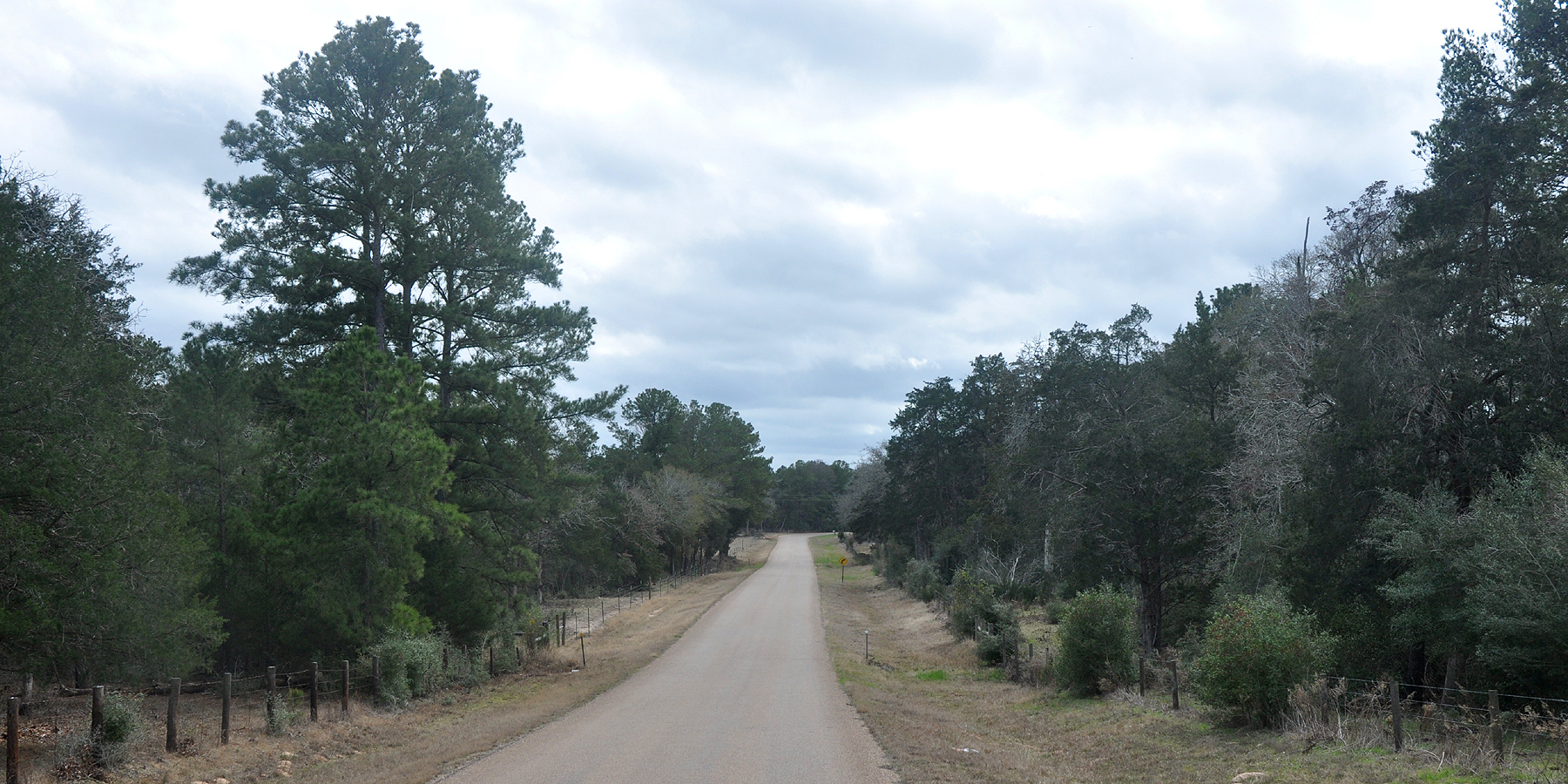
Southern Post Oak Savannah, Colorado County, (January 2014).

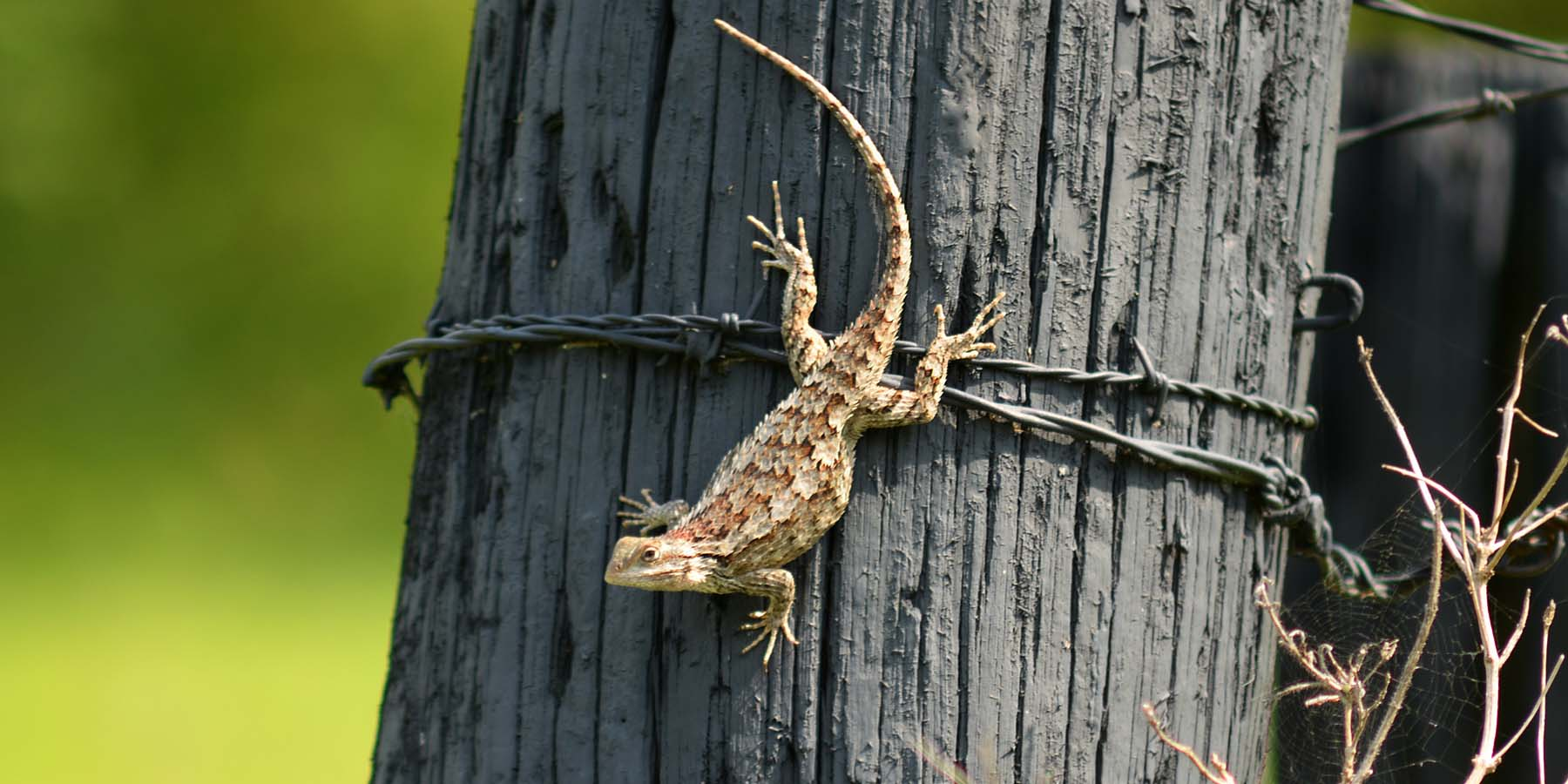
Texas spiny lizard (Sceloporus olivaceus) on a fencepost, Colorado County, (March 2017).

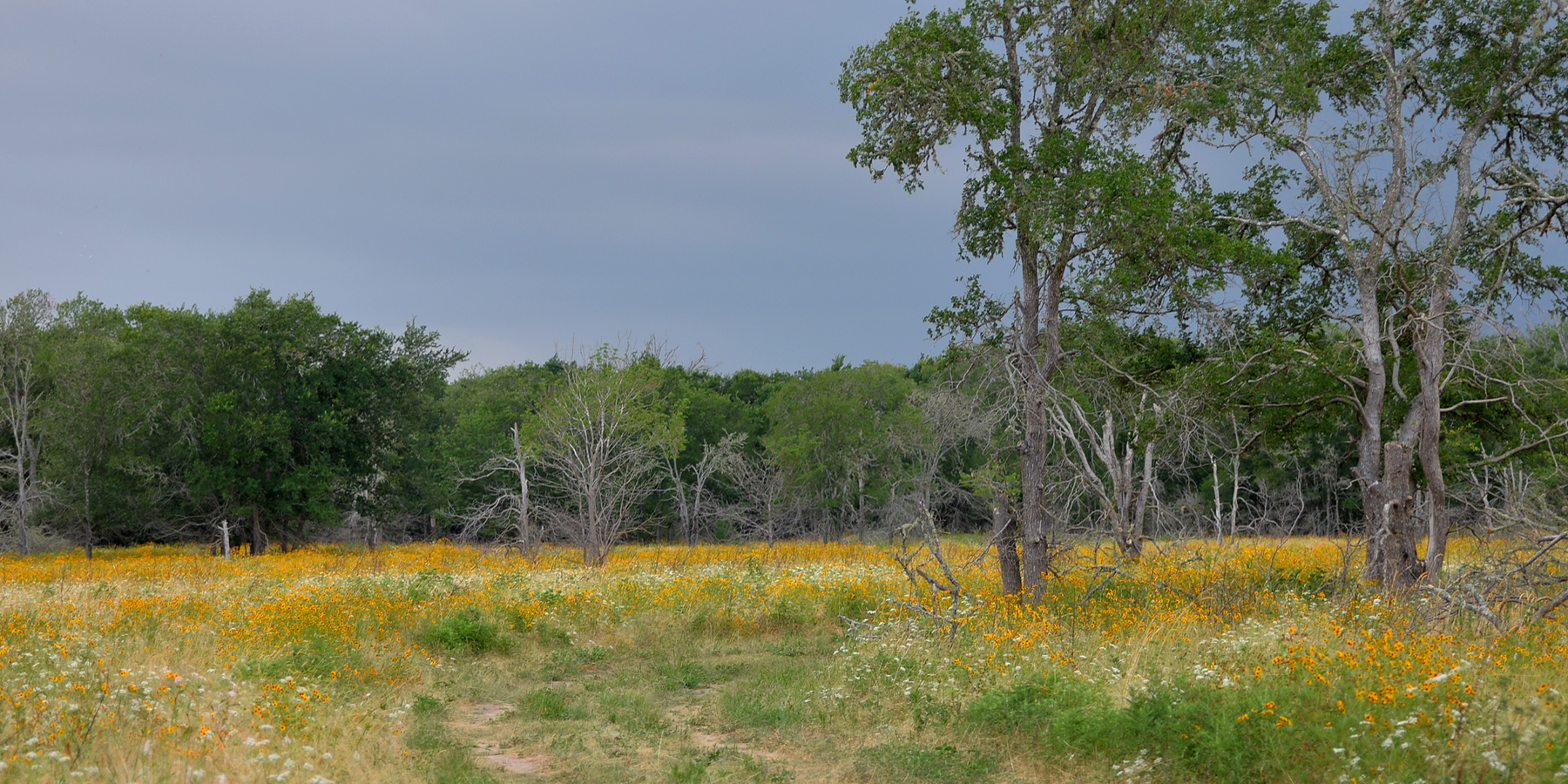
Lake Somerville State Park. Lee County, (May 2017).

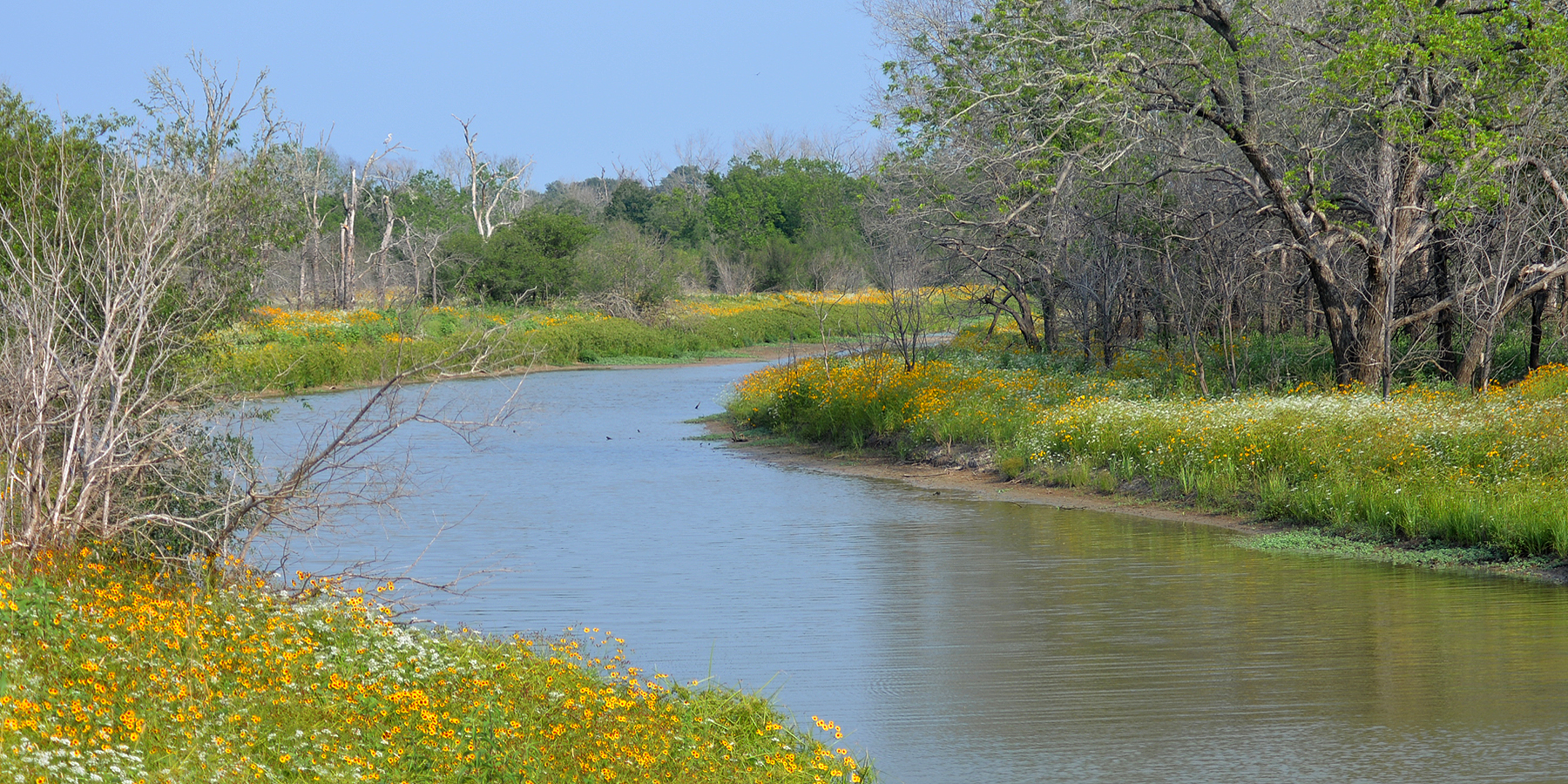
Lake Somerville State Park, Lee County (May 2017).

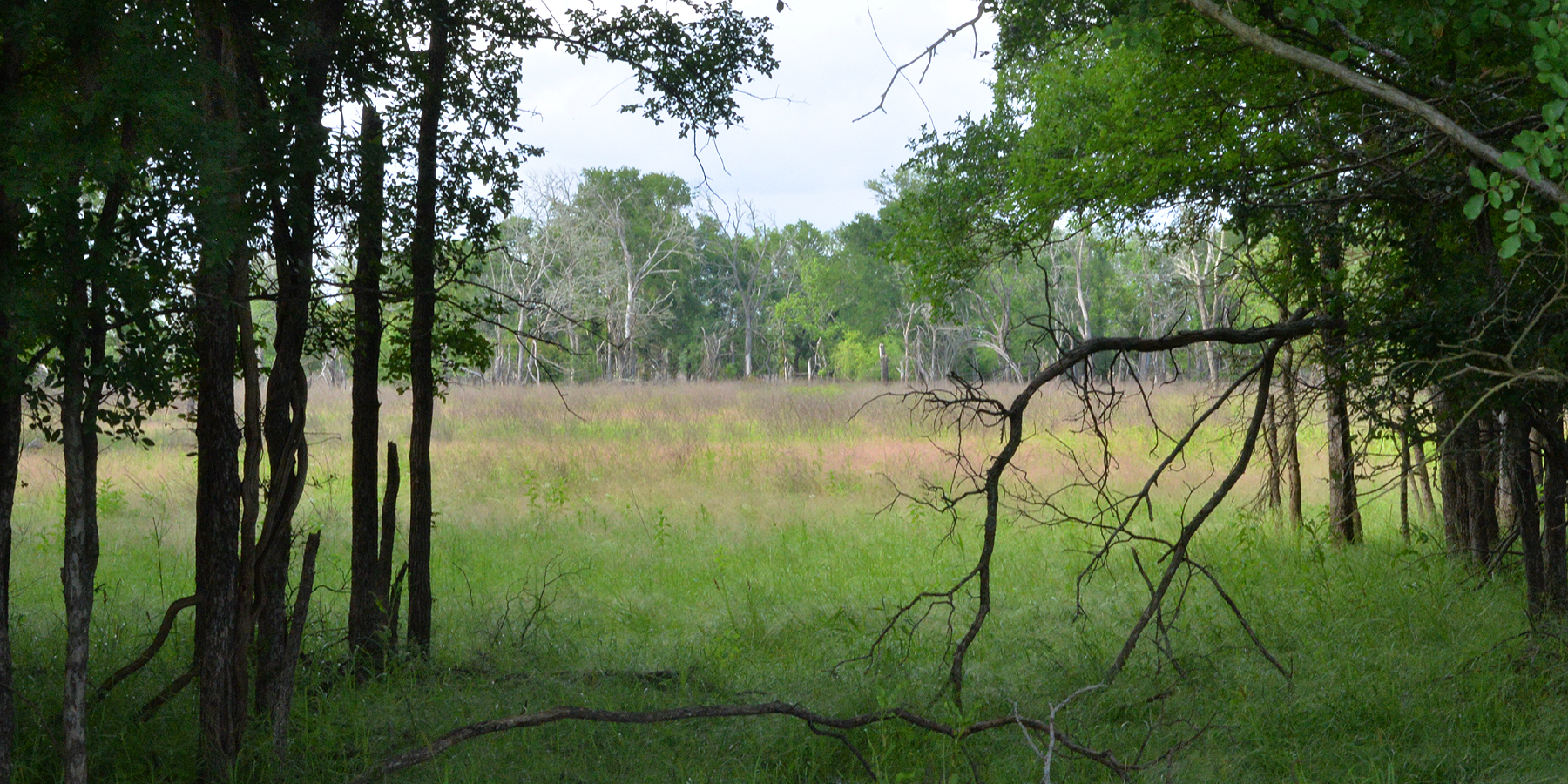
Lake Somerville State Park, Lee County (May 2019).

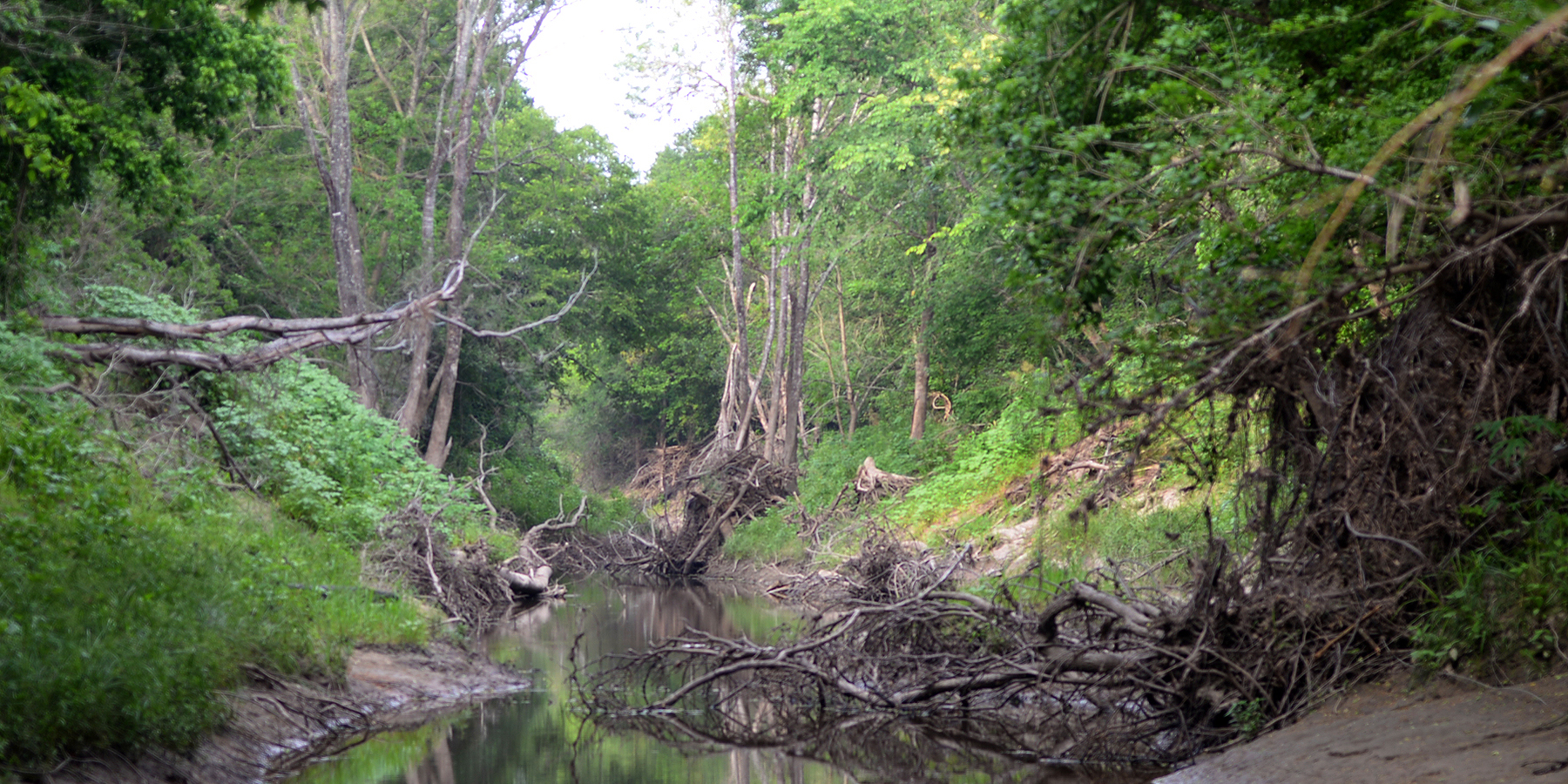
Nails Creek, Somerville Public Hunting Lands, Lee County (April 2017).

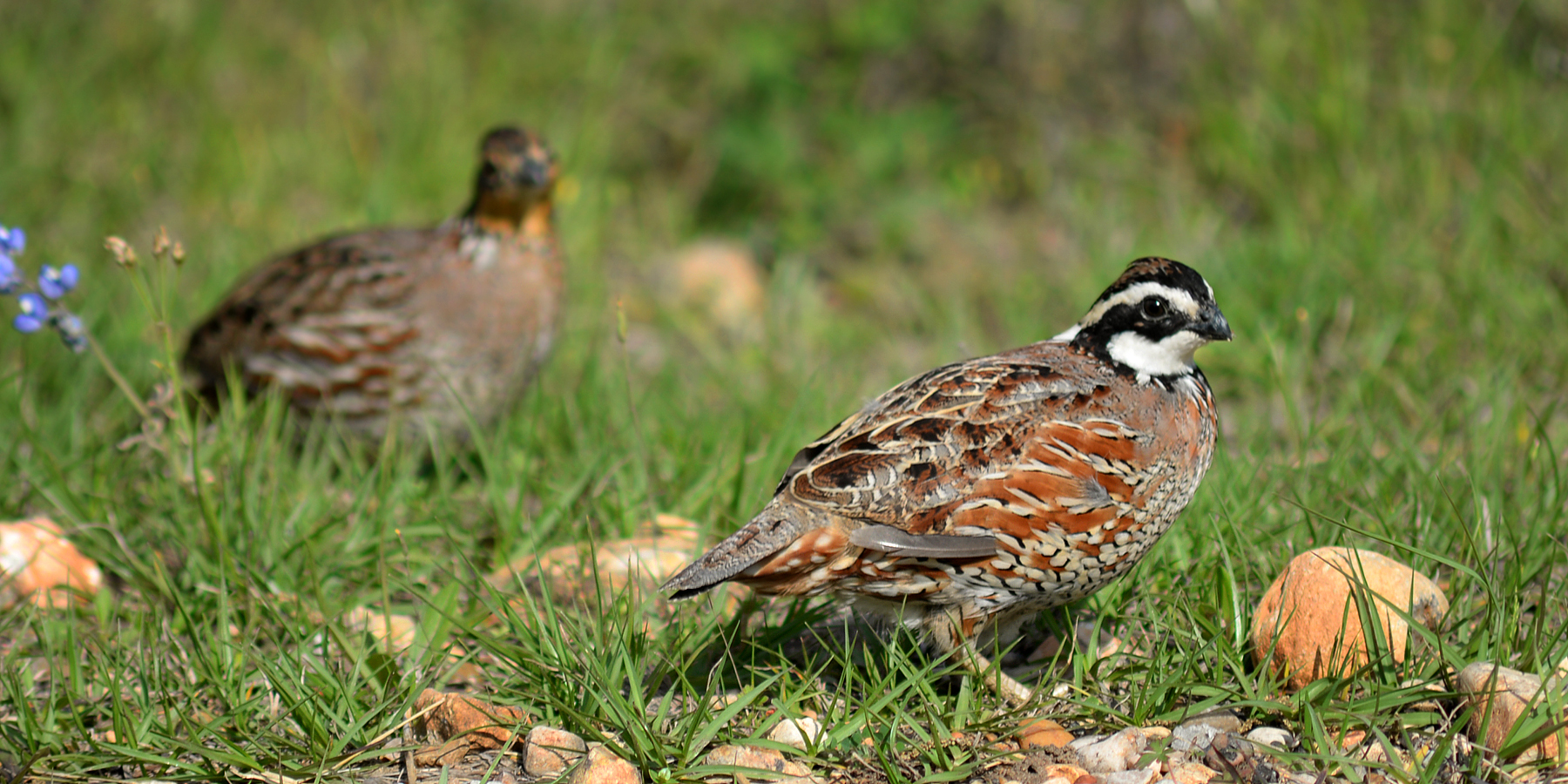
Northern Bobwhite (Colinus virginianus), male right, female left, Colorado County (March 2017).

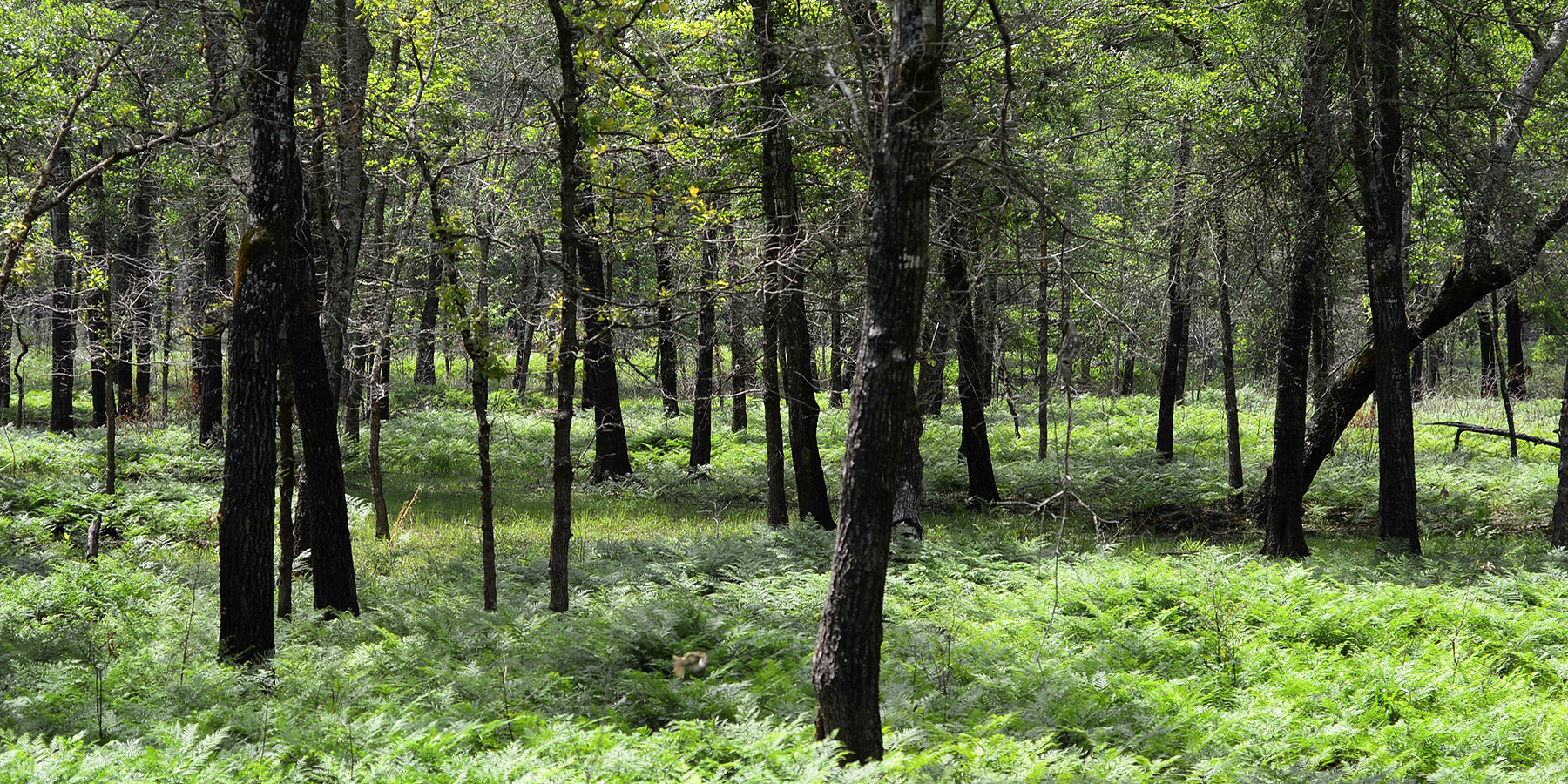
Northern Post Oak Savanna, Gus Engeling Wildlife Management Area, Anderson County (April 2017).

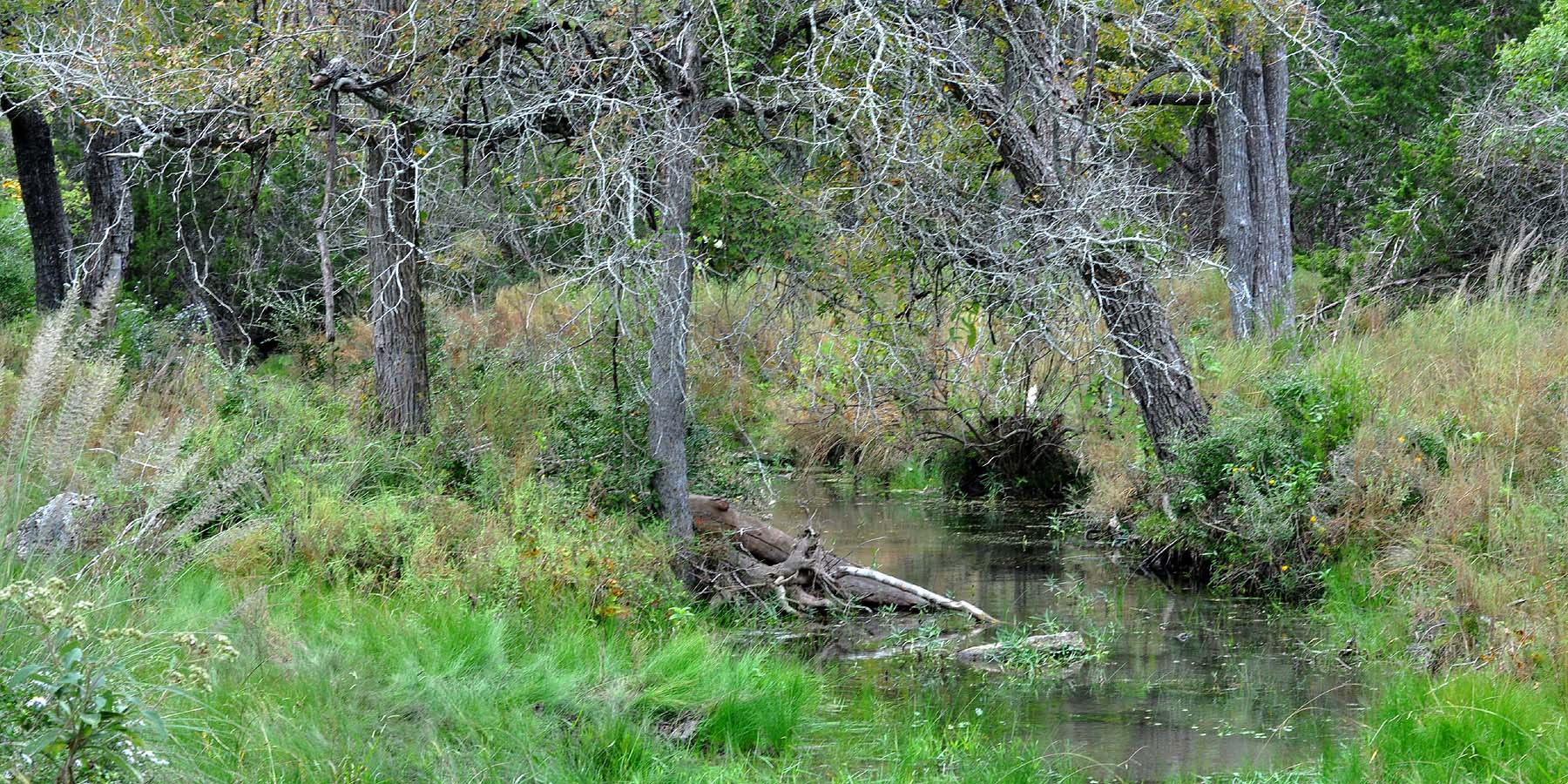
Little Bear Creek, Hays County (October 2010).

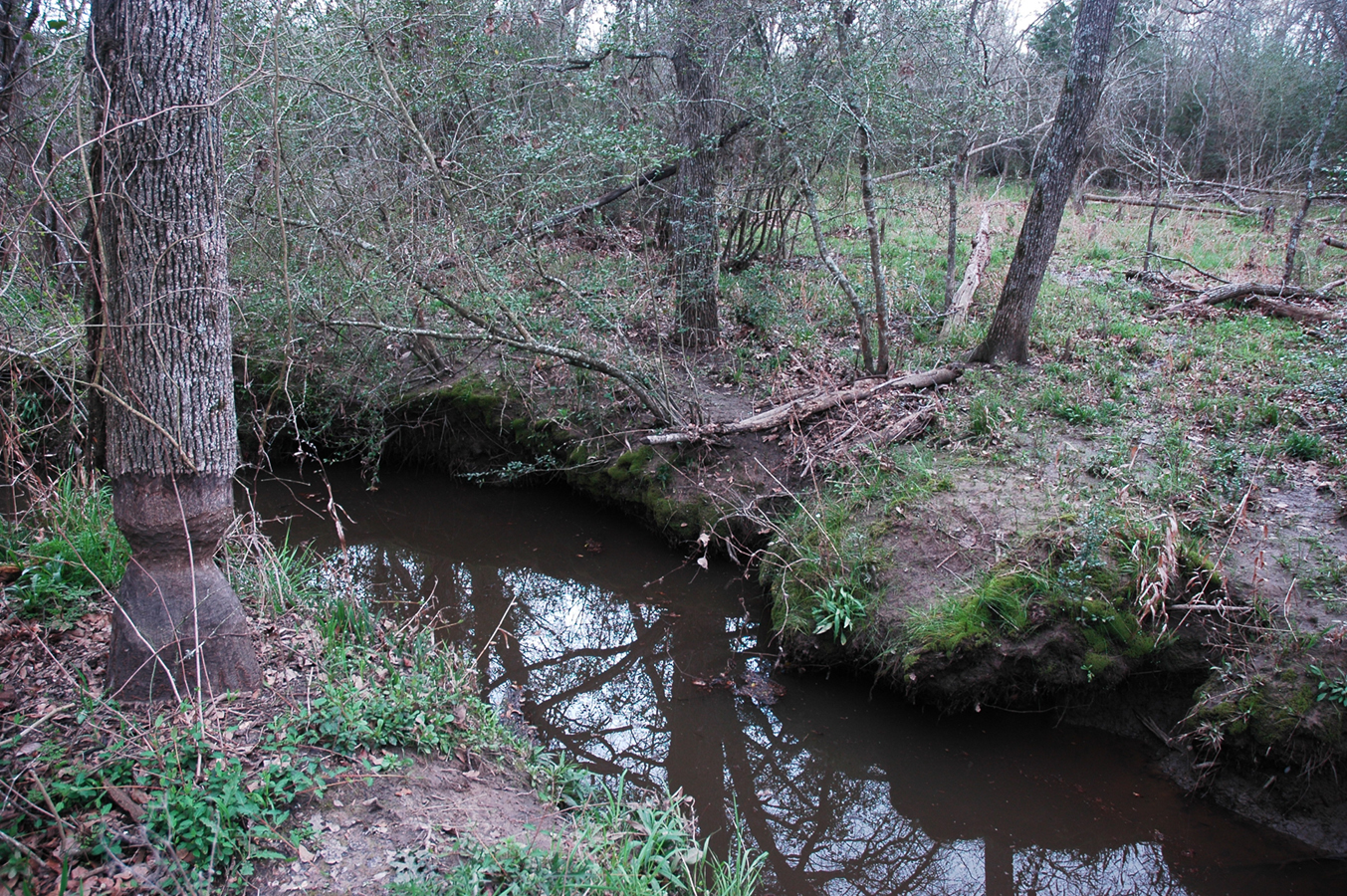
Signs of beaver (Castor canadensis) activity, gnawed tree trunk and burrowing in stream bank. Madison County (March 2010).

== See also ==
- History of Texas forests
- List of ecoregions in the United States (WWF)
