= Gus Engeling Wildlife Management Area =

Protected area in Texas, United States

- IUCN category V (protected landscape/seascape)
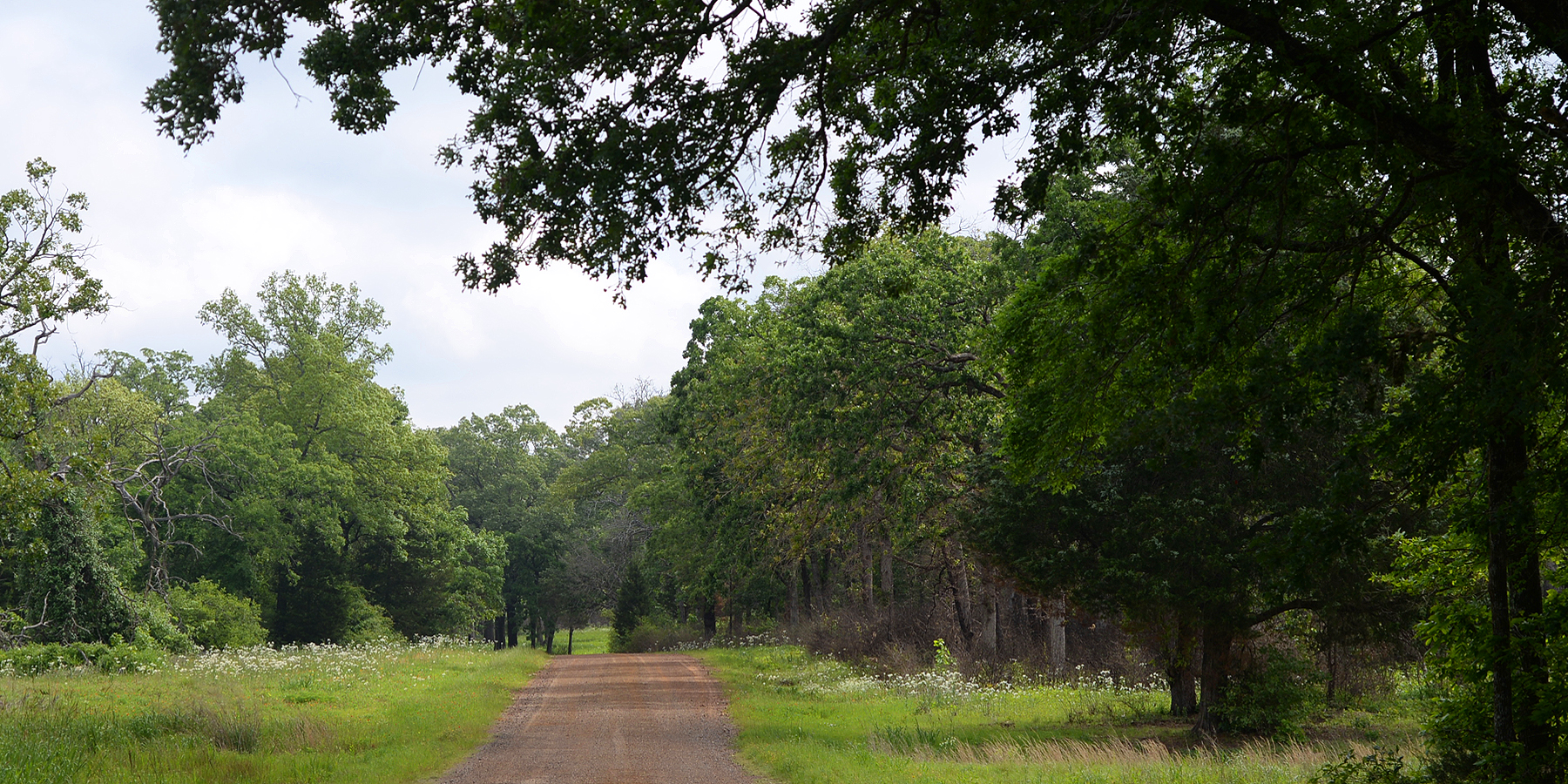
- Interactive map of Gus Engeling Wildlife Management Area
- Nearest city: Palestine, Texas
- Coordinates: 31.95°N 95.89°W
- Area: 11,095 acres (44.90 km^{2})
- Created: 1950
- Governing body: Texas Parks and Wildlife

The Gus Engeling Wildlife Management Area is located in East Texas, United States, 21 miles from Palestine, Texas. The area covers 11,000 acres (4,500 ha) and protects post oak savannah. The area is actively managed and permits hunting from mid-October through mid-March. Catfish Creek runs through the area.

Originally named the Derden Wildlife Management Area (after Milze L. Derden, from whom much of this land was purchased), it was renamed in 1952 after Gus A. Engeling, the first game warden assigned to the area, who was shot and killed by a poacher on December 13, 1951.

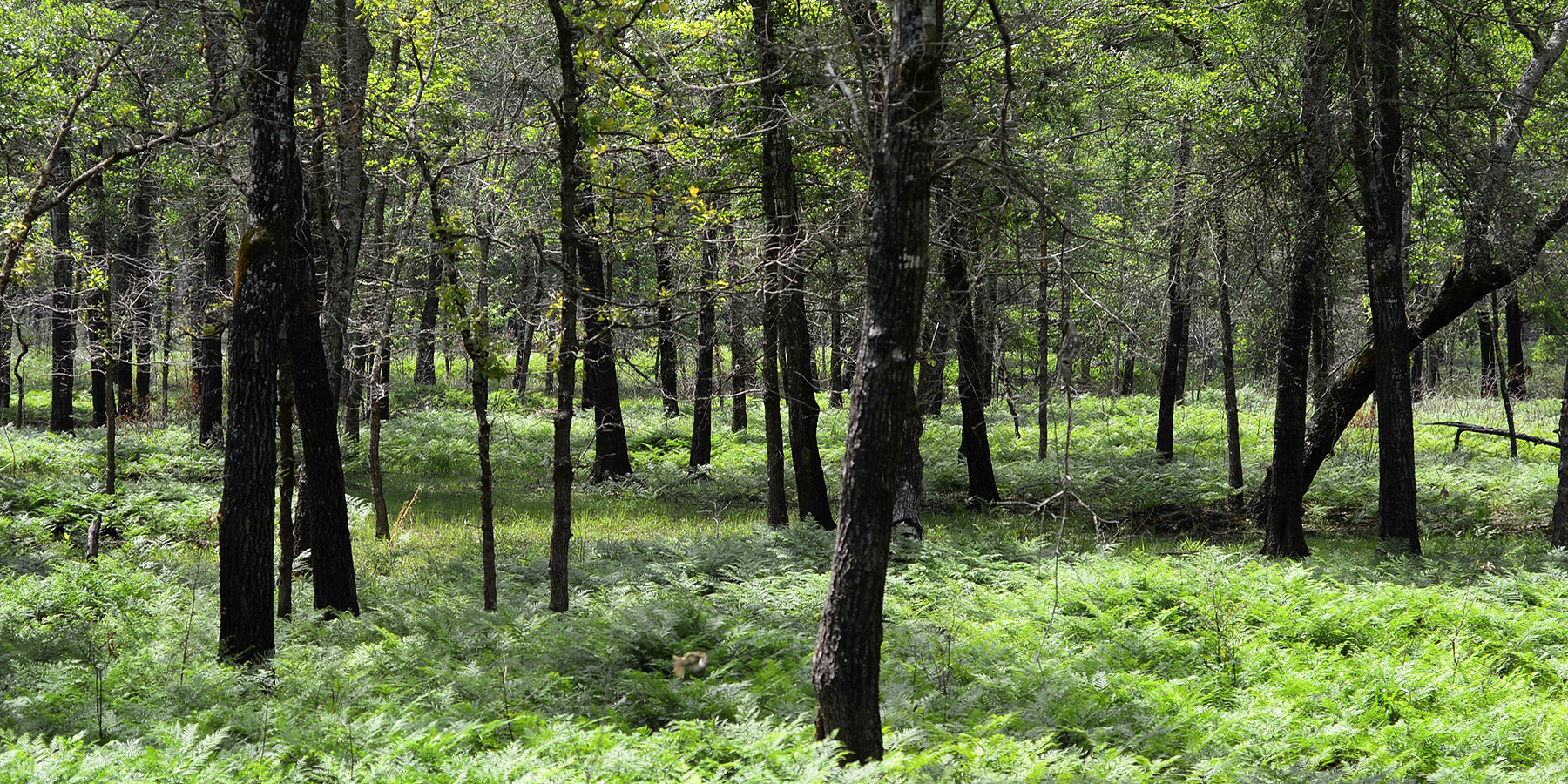
Post Oak Savannah in the WMA
