= Lake Somerville State Park and Trailway =

State park in Texas, United States

Lake Somerville State Park & Trailway
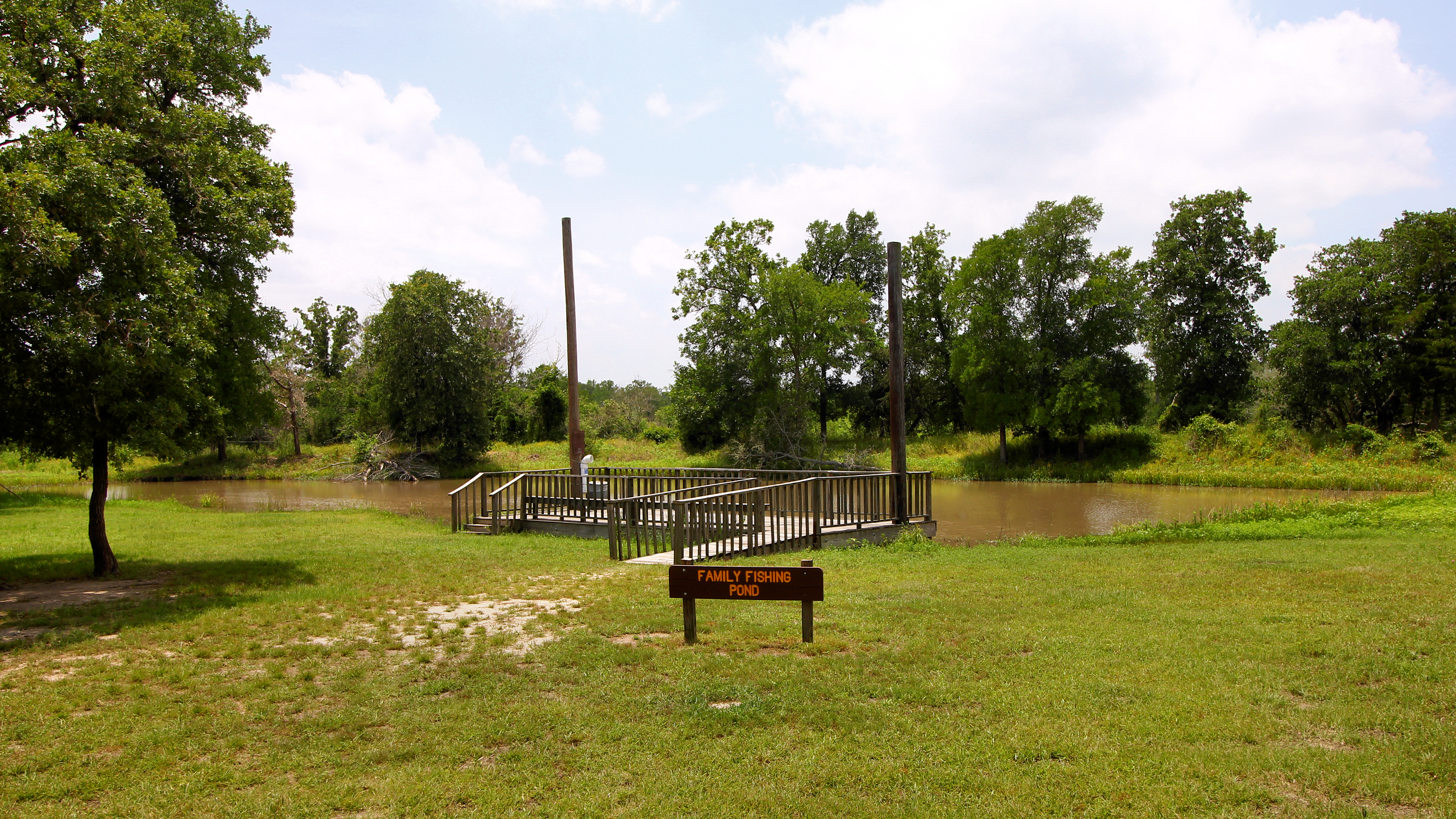
- The Family Fishing Pond at the Nails Creek Unit

- Location within Texas Location within the United States
- Location: Lee County and Burleson County, Texas
- Nearest city: Burton
- Coordinates: 30°17′27″N 96°40′2″W
- Area: 8,700 acres (3,521 ha)
- Established: 1969
- Visitors: 131,365 (in 2025)
- Governing body: Texas Parks and Wildlife Department
- Website: Official site

Lake Somerville State Park and Trailway is an 8,700-acre (3,500 ha) state park located in Lee County and Burleson County, Texas on the shore of Lake Somerville. The park is a complex of four units; Lake Somerville State Park-Birch Creek Unit, Lake Somerville State Park-Nails Creek Unit, Somerville Trailway and Somerville Public Hunting Land. The park opened in 1970 and is managed by the Texas Parks and Wildlife Department (TPWD).

== History ==
Archaeological surveys place aboriginal hunter-gatherer groups in the area generally between ca. A.D. 900-1800 and Caddo people after A.D. 1400.

The United States Army Corps of Engineers started the construction of Lake Somerville in June 1962. Impoundment of water commenced in January 1967. The lake has an 85 mi (137 km) shoreline and occupies an area of 11,630 acres (4,710 ha). Its main purposes are flood control, municipal water supply and recreation. TPWD leased land along the lake in 1969 from the federal government and opened the park in 1970. TPWD manages the Somerville Public Hunting Land under a license agreement and in cooperation with the Corps of Engineers.

== Nature ==
=== Animals ===
Animals in the park include white-tailed deer, fox, coyote, bobcat, North American river otter, raccoon, American alligator, rabbit, six-lined racerunner, cottonmouth and Mexican long-nosed armadillo.

Birding is a special draw for the park. Killdeer, turkey vulture, black vulture, northern cardinal, common grackle northern mockingbird and blue jay are common in the park. Sandhill cranes, egrets, herons, white-faced ibis, American white pelican, grebes, cormorants, and a variety of ducks are documented in the wetlands. In the colder months, keep an eye out for wintering bald eagles and migrating osprey.

Anglers might catch white bass, crappie, largemouth bass and catfish.

=== Plants ===
Trees in the park include live oak, post oak, water oak, yaupon holly, and hickory. Other plants found are little bluestem and wild grape. In the spring bluebonnets, Indian paintbrush, pink evening primrose, phlox, and winecups bloom. Branched blazing star, woodland spider-lily and buttonbush show up in the summer.

== Activities ==
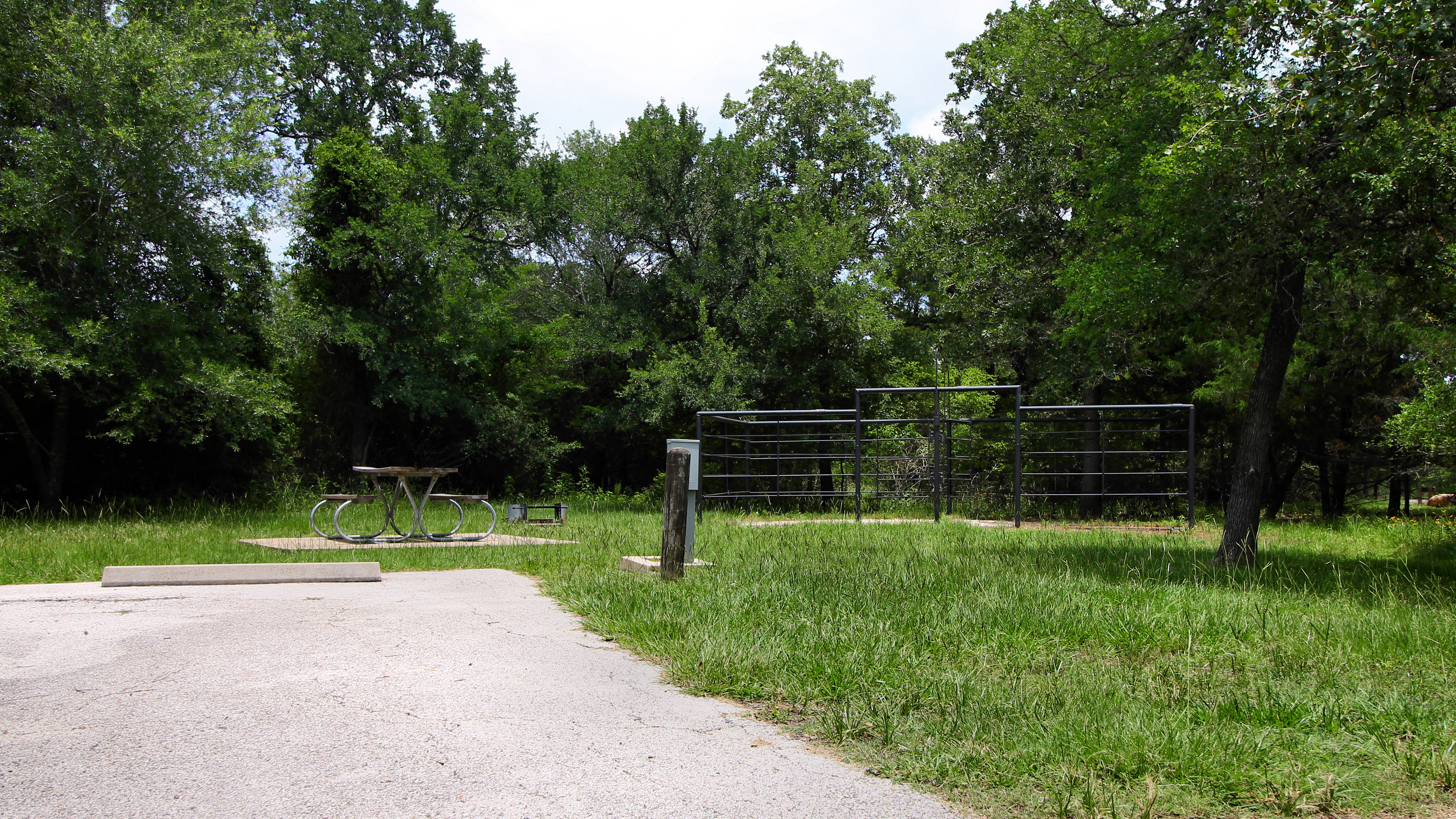
Campsite with horse pen.

The park has over 150 sites designated for camping, most with water and electricity available and some with horse pens and hitching posts. There is also primitive camping along the 13-mile trailway. There are almost 40 miles of trails for hiking, cycling, and horseback riding. Boating, paddling, swimming, fishing, picnicking, geocaching and birding are also available in the park.

== See also ==
- List of Texas state parks
