= Oresteia =

Trilogy of Greek tragedies written by Aeschylus

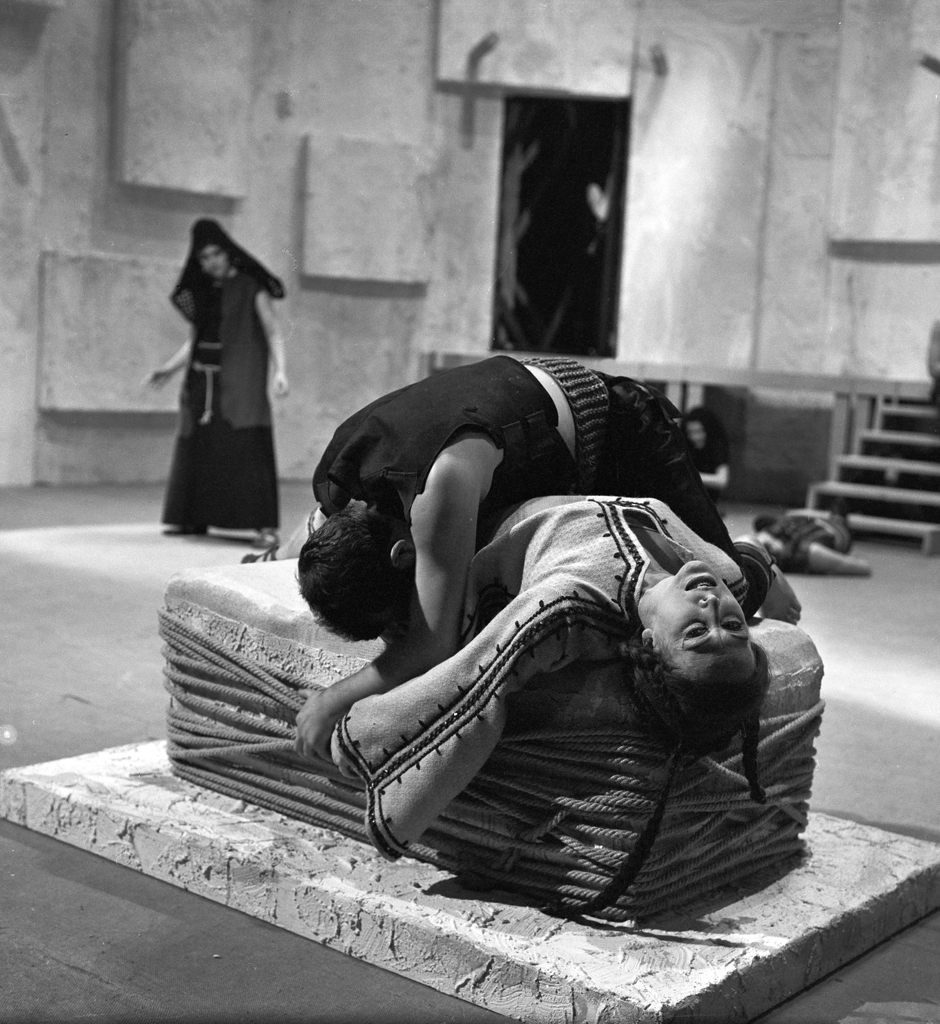
- SNG Drama Ljubljana performs an adaptation of The Oresteia, in 1968
- Original language: Greek
- Written by: Aeschylus
- Genre: Tragedy

The Oresteia (Ancient Greek: Ὀρέστεια) is a trilogy of Greek tragedies written by Aeschylus in the 5th century BC concerning the murder of Agamemnon by Clytemnestra, the murder of Clytemnestra by Orestes, the trial of Orestes, the end of the curse on the House of Atreus and the pacification of the Furies (also called Erinyes or Eumenides).

The Oresteia trilogy consists of three plays: Agamemnon, The Libation Bearers and The Eumenides. It shows how the Greek gods interacted with the characters and influenced their decisions pertaining to events and disputes. The only extant example of an ancient Greek theatre trilogy, the Oresteia won first prize at the Dionysia festival in 458 BC. The principal themes of the trilogy include the contrast between revenge and justice, as well as the transition from personal vendetta to organized litigation. Oresteia originally included a satyr play, Proteus (Πρωτεύς), following the tragic trilogy, but all except a single line of Proteus has been lost.

== Agamemnon ==
Agamemnon
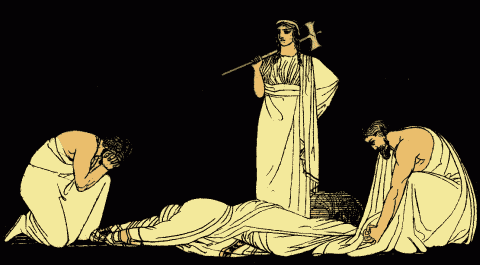
- The murder of Agamemnon, from an 1879 illustration from Stories from the Greek Tragedians by Alfred Church
- Written by: Aeschylus
- Chorus: Elders of Argos
- Characters: Watchman; Clytemnestra; Herald; Agamemnon; Messenger; Cassandra; Aegisthus
- Mute: Soldiers; Servants
- Setting: Argos, before the royal palace

Agamemnon (Ἀγαμέμνων, Agamémnōn) is the first of the three plays within the Oresteia trilogy. It details the homecoming of Agamemnon, King of Mycenae, from the Trojan War. After ten years of warfare, and Troy fallen, all of Greece could lay claim to the victory. Waiting at home for Agamemnon is his wife, Queen Clytemnestra, who has been plotting his murder. She desires his death to avenge the sacrifice of her daughter Iphigenia, to exterminate the only thing hindering her from taking the crown, and to finally be able to publicly embrace her good-time lover Aegisthus.

The play opens with a watchman looking down and over the sea, reporting that he has been lying restless "like a dog" for a year, waiting to see some sort of signal confirming a Greek victory in Troy. He laments the fortunes of the house but promises to keep silent: "A huge ox has stepped onto my tongue." The watchman sees a light of a far-off bonfire signaling the fall of Troy, is overjoyed at the victory and hopes for the hasty return of his king, as the house has "wallowed" in his absence. Clytemnestra is introduced to the audience and she declares that there will be celebrations and sacrifices throughout the city as Agamemnon and his army return.

Upon the return of Agamemnon, his wife laments in full view of Argos how horrible the wait for her husband and King has been. After her soliloquy, Clytemnestra pleads with and persuades Agamemnon to walk on the robes laid out for him. This is a very ominous moment in the play, as loyalties and motives are questioned. The King's new concubine, Cassandra, is now introduced, and this immediately spawns hatred from the queen, Clytemnestra. Cassandra is ordered out of her chariot and to the altar, where, once she is alone, she begins predicting the death of Agamemnon and her own shared fate.

Inside the house a cry is heard: Agamemnon has been stabbed in the bathtub. The chorus separates from one another and rambles to themselves, proving their cowardice, when another final cry is heard. When the doors are finally opened, Clytemnestra is seen standing over the dead bodies of Agamemnon and Cassandra. Clytemnestra describes the murder in detail to the chorus, showing no sign of remorse or regret. Suddenly, the exiled lover of Clytemnestra, Aegisthus, bursts into the palace to take his place next to her. Aegisthus proudly states that he devised the plan to murder Agamemnon and claim revenge for his father (the father of Aegisthus, Thyestes, was tricked into eating two of his sons by his brother Atreus, the father of Agamemnon). Clytemnestra claims that she and Aegisthus now have all the power, and they re-enter the palace with the doors closing behind them.

Like most Greek tragedies, Agamemnon is a morally complex play. Agamemnon may be an admired veteran of the Trojan War but it is made clear that many do not approve of the way he sacrificed his daughter Iphigenia. Many citizens resent Agamemnon because they lost their sons and husbands in the war he initiated. Similarly, Clytemnestra is both her husband's murderer and her daughter's avenger; Aeschylus continues to explore the fundamental moral quandary of vengeance and "justified" bloodshed in The Libation Bearers and The Eumenides.

== The Libation Bearers ==
The Libation Bearers
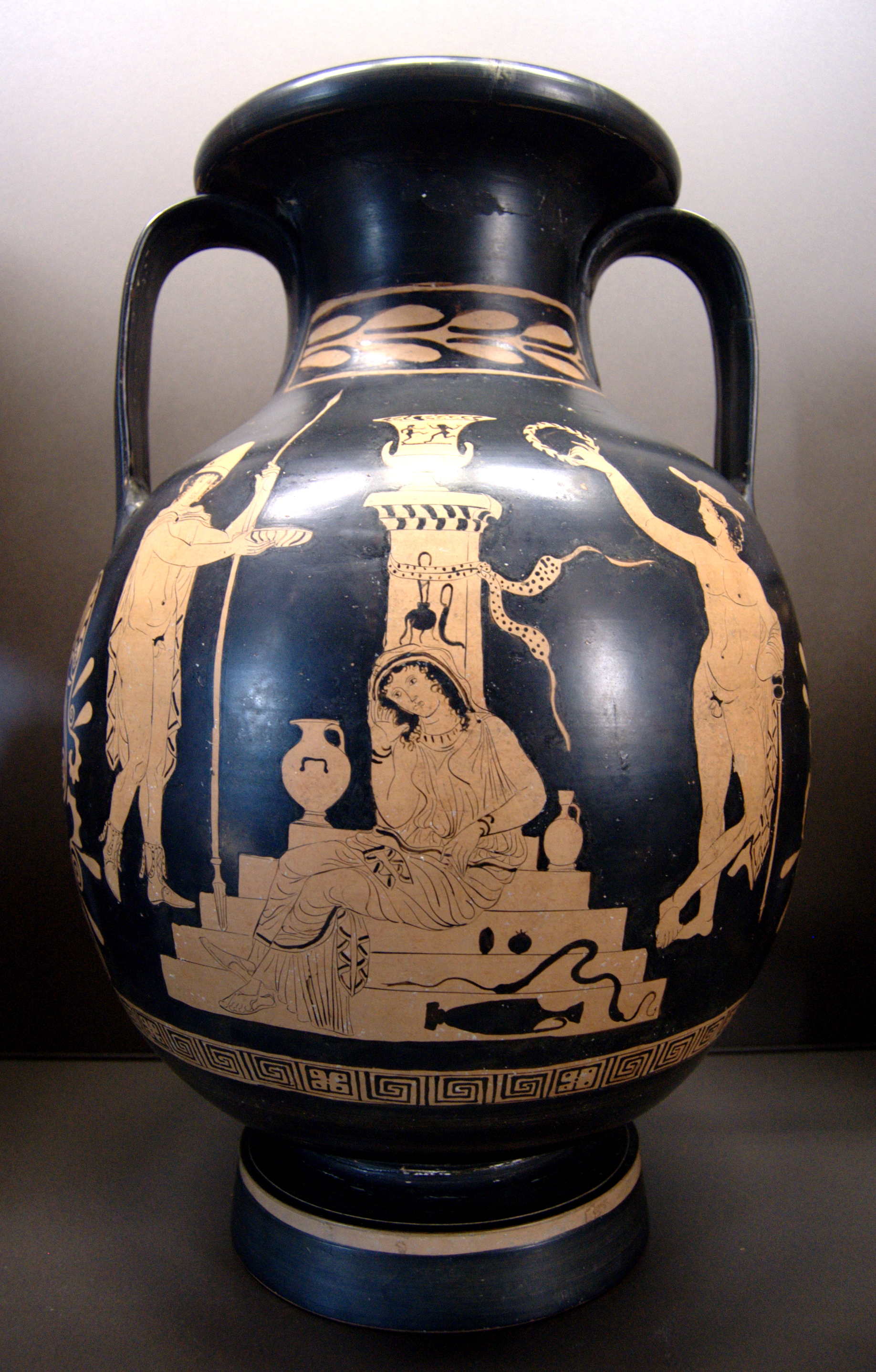
- Orestes, Electra and Hermes in front of Agamemnon's tomb by Choephoroi Painter
- Written by: Aeschylus
- Chorus: Slave women
- Characters: Orestes; Electra; Servant; Clytemnestra; Pylades; Cilissa; Aegisthus; Attendants
- Setting: 1. Argos, at the tomb of Agamemnon; 2. Argos, before the royal palace

In The Libation Bearers (Χοηφόροι, Choēphóroi)—the second play of Aeschylus' Oresteia trilogy—many years after the murder of Agamemnon, his son Orestes returns to Argos with his cousin Pylades to exact vengeance on Clytemnestra, as an order from Apollo, for killing Agamemnon. Upon arriving, Orestes reunites with his sister Electra at Agamemnon's grave, while she was there bringing libations to Agamemnon in an attempt to stop Clytemnestra's bad dreams. Shortly after the reunion, both Orestes and Electra, influenced by the Chorus, come up with a plan to kill both Clytemnestra and Aegisthus.

Orestes then goes to the palace door, where he is greeted by Clytemnestra. He pretends he is a stranger and tells Clytemnestra that he (Orestes) is dead, causing her to send for Aegisthus. Unrecognized, Orestes is then able to enter the palace, where he then kills Aegisthus, who was without a guard due to the intervention of the chorus in relaying Clytemnestra's message. Clytemnestra then enters the room. Orestes hesitates to kill her, but Pylades reminds him of Apollo's orders, and he eventually follows through. Consequently, after committing the matricide, Orestes is now the target of the Furies' merciless wrath and has no choice but to flee from the palace.

=== Chorus ===
The Chorus in The Libation Bearers is distinctly different from the one in Agamemnon. From Agamemnon to The Libation Bearers, the Chorus switches from a collection of old, Argive men, to foreign slave women.^{p. 46-48} Furthermore, the Chorus in Agamemnon possessed a fearful voice, characterized by their critical commentary on the events and characters of the play. Despite this, they play a passive role and do not influence the plot.^{p. 47-48} In contrast, The Libation Bearers' Chorus desire vengeance, and influence both Electra's and Orestes' actions, shepherding Orestes towards revenge.^{p. 48-52}

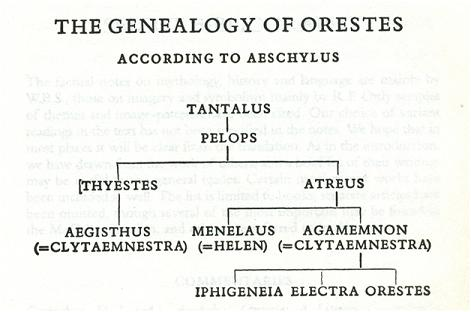
Genealogy of Orestes

== The Eumenides ==
The Eumenides
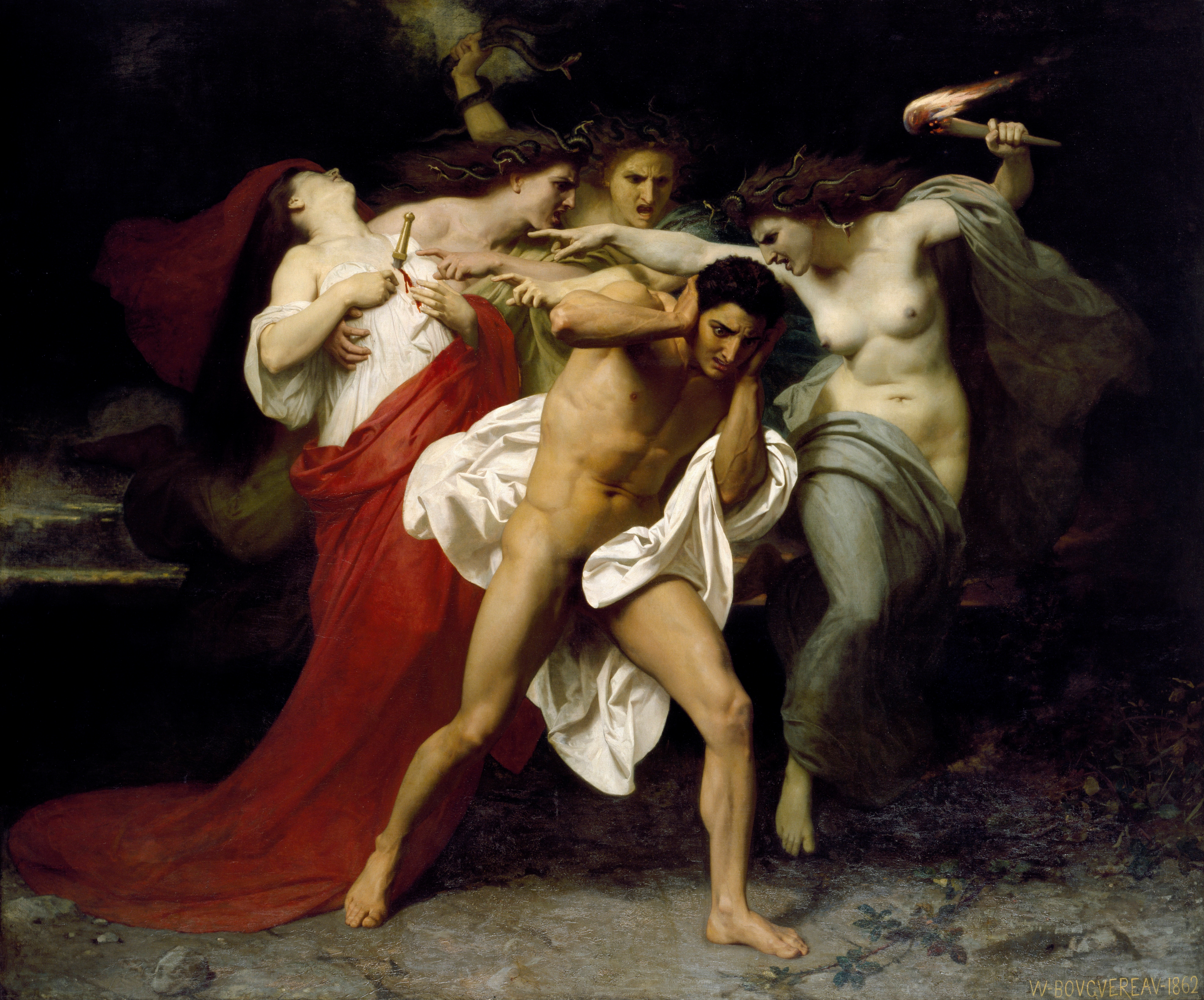
- Orestes Pursued by the Furies by William-Adolphe Bouguereau
- Written by: Aeschylus
- Chorus: The Furies
- Characters: Priestess; Apollo; Orestes; Ghost of Clytemnestra; Athena; Athenian citizens
- Setting: before the temple of Apollo at Delphi and in Athens

The final play of the Oresteia, called The Eumenides (Εὐμενίδες, Eumenídes), illustrates how the sequence of events in the trilogy ends up in the development of social order or a proper judicial system in Athenian society. In this play, Orestes is hunted and tormented by the Furies, a trio of goddesses known to be the instruments of justice, who are also referred to as the "Gracious Ones" (Eumenides). They relentlessly pursue Orestes for the killing of his mother. Through the intervention of Apollo, Orestes is able to escape them for a brief moment while they are asleep and escape to Athens under the protection of Hermes. Seeing the Furies asleep, Clytemnestra's ghost comes to wake them up to obtain justice on her son Orestes for killing her.

After waking up, the Furies hunt Orestes again and when they find him, Orestes pleads to the goddess Athena for help. She responds by setting up a trial for him in Athens on the Areopagus. This trial is made up of a group of twelve Athenian citizens and is supervised by Athena. Here Orestes is used as a trial dummy by Athena to set up the first courtroom trial. He is also the object of the Furies, Apollo, and Athena. After the trial comes to an end, the votes are tied. Athena casts the deciding vote and determines that Orestes will not be killed. This does not sit well with the Furies but Athena eventually persuades them to accept the decision; instead of violently retaliating against wrongdoers, they become a constructive force of vigilance in Athens. She then changes their names from the Furies to "the Eumenides" which means "the Gracious Ones". Athena then ultimately rules that all trials must henceforth be settled in court rather than being carried out personally.

== Proteus ==
Proteus (Πρωτεύς, Prōteus), the satyr play which originally followed the first three plays of The Oresteia, is lost except for a two-line fragment preserved by Athenaeus. It is widely believed to have been based on the story told in Book IV of Homer's Odyssey, where Menelaus, Agamemnon's brother, tries to return home from Troy and finds himself on an island off Egypt, "whither he seems to have been carried by the storm described in Agam.674".

The title character, "the deathless Egyptian Proteus", the Old Man of the Sea, is described in Homer as having been visited by Menelaus, who sought to learn his future. Proteus tells Menelaus of the death of Agamemnon at the hands of Aegisthus and the fates of Ajax the Lesser and Odysseus at sea. Proteus is compelled to tell Menelaus how to reach home from the island of Pharos:

The satyrs who may have found themselves on the island as a result of shipwreck . . . perhaps gave assistance to Menelaus and escaped with him, though he may have had difficulty in ensuring that they keep their hands off Helen.

The only extant fragment that has been definitively attributed to Proteus was translated by Herbert Weir Smyth:

A wretched piteous dove, in quest of food, dashed amid the winnowing-fans, its breast broken in twain.

In 2002, Theatre Kingston mounted a production of The Oresteia and included a new reconstruction of Proteus based on the episode in The Odyssey and loosely arranged according to the structure of extant satyr plays.

== Themes ==
=== Justice through retaliation ===
Retaliation is seen in the Oresteia to cascade. In Agamemnon, it is mentioned that Agamemnon had to sacrifice his innocent daughter Iphigenia to shift the wind for his voyage to Troy. This caused Clytemnestra to plot revenge on Agamemnon. She found a new lover Aegisthus and when Agamemnon returned to Argos from the Trojan War, Clytemnestra killed him by stabbing him in the bathtub and went on to inherit his throne. The death of Agamemnon thus sparks anger in Orestes and Electra; they plot matricide (the death of their mother Clytemnestra) in the next play, Libation Bearers. Through much pressure from Electra and his cousin Pylades, Orestes kills Clytemnestra and her lover, Aegisthus. Consequently, Orestes is hunted down by the Furies in the third play The Eumenides. Even after he escapes, Clytemnestra's spirit comes back to rally them again so that they can kill Orestes and obtain vengeance for her. However, this cycle of retaliation comes to a stop near the end of The Eumenides when Athena decides to introduce a new legal system for dealing out justice.

=== Justice through the law ===
Justice through the law is achieved in The Eumenides. After Orestes begged Athena for deliverance from the Furies, she granted him his request in the form of a trial. Rather than forgiving Orestes directly, Athena put him to trial to find a just answer to the question of his innocence. This is the first example of proper litigation in the trilogy and illuminates the change from emotional retaliation to civilized decisions regarding alleged crimes. Instead of allowing the Furies to torture Orestes, she decided that she would have both the Furies and Orestes plead their case before she decided on the verdict. In addition, Athena set up how the verdict would be decided. By creating this blueprint, the future of revenge-killings and the merciless hunting of the Furies would be eliminated from Greece. The trial sets the foundation for future litigation. Aeschylus, through his jury trial, was able to create and maintain a social commentary about the limitations of revenge crimes and reiterate the importance of trials. The Oresteia, as a whole, stands as a representation of the evolution of justice in Ancient Greece.

=== Revenge ===
Revenge is a principal motivator for most characters in Oresteia. The theme starts in Agamemnon with Clytemnestra, who murders her husband, Agamemnon, in order to obtain vengeance for his sacrificing of their daughter, Iphigenia. The death of Cassandra, the princess of Troy, taken captive by Agamemnon in order to fill a place as a concubine, can also be seen as an act of revenge for taking another woman as well as the life of Iphigenia. Later on, in The Libation Bearers, Orestes and Electra (siblings and remaining children of Agamemnon and Clytemnestra) succeed in killing their mother to avenge their father's death. In The Eumenides, the Furies—goddesses of vengeance—seek to take revenge on Orestes for the murder of his mother. It is also discovered that the god Apollo played a part in the act of vengeance toward Clytemnestra through Orestes. The cycle of revenge is seen to be broken when Orestes is not killed by the Furies, but is instead given his freedom and deemed innocent by the goddess Athena.

=== Mother-right and father-right ===
To the anthropologist Johann Jakob Bachofen (Das Mutterrecht, 1861), the Oresteia shows Ancient Greece's transition from "hetaerism" (polyamory) to monogamy; and from "mother-right" (matriarchal lineage) to "father-right" (patriarchal lineage). According to Bachofen, religious laws changed in this period: the Apollo and Athena of The Eumenides present the patriarchal view. The Furies contrast what they call "gods of new descent" with the view that matricide is more serious than the killing of men. With Athena acquitting Orestes, and the Furies working for the new gods, The Eumenides shows the newfound dominance of father-right over mother-right.

Bachofen's interpretation was influential among Marxists and feminists. Feminist Simone de Beauvoir wrote in The Second Sex (1949) that the tribunal saw Orestes as son of Agamemnon before being son of Clytemnestra. In The Origin of the Family, Private Property and the State (1884), Marxist Friedrich Engels praises Bachofen's "correct interpretation". Nonetheless, he sees it as "pure mysticism" by Bachofen to see the change in divine perspectives as the cause of the change in Greek society. Instead, Engels considers economic factors—the creation of private property—and the "natural sexual behaviour" of men and women. For the feminist Kate Millett, the latter factor is mistaken, and The Eumenides is important in documenting the state's arguments for repression of women.

=== Matricide and femininity ===
Electra's role in the murder of her mother has been hotly contested by scholars throughout time. Many view Electra's by-proxy killing of her mother as a representation of daughter-inflicted matricide.

Psychoanalyst Carl Jung attributes her behavior to what he coined as the "Electra complex" the jealousy of the daughter towards the mother for her sexual engagement with the father. Sigmund Freud disagreed with this claim, noting that the "Oedipus complex" cannot be applied directly to the female sex, since sons do not undergo the same penis-envy as daughters. Many contemporary scholars have theorized what this matricide means in the context of womanhood: Dana Tor invokes Lacan to argue that Electra's scheming represents a "ravage" between mother and daughter; Doris Bernstein sees the murder as a step on the path towards Electra's individuation; and Melanie Klein views it as emblematic of the dual power of the psyche to split of the mother into a good object and a bad one. Serena Heller recalls Ronald Britton's idea of the Athene-Antigone Complex to explain Electra's hatred of her mother deriving from an intense idolization of her father and, thus, a compulsion to exonerate herself from the restraints of feminity and the female body. Once the girl recognizes her gendered difference in the world, she must undergo re-cognition, deciding whether to mourn the maleness that she does not possess, or engage in a choice which frees them from their gendered bind. Athene, Antigone, and Electra all have a desire for "female castration" that dictates their choices in their patriarchal societies. Amber Jacobs also claims that the matricide in the Oresteia ultimately embodies a societal repulsion towards the female gender, as Athena's motherless status allows Zeus to argue that the father is more important than the mother and absolve Orestes of his crimes. Tor ultimately claims that the convergence of both Orestes' and Electra's motivations for revenge are two-fold: both a repayment for the debt of desire and a symbol of feminine jouissance. They must repay their Freudian or Jungian debts from the guilt of want. Their jouissance in her death arises from a pre-genital dichotomy of love and hatred from the son and the daughter towards the mother.

Professor of philosophical and historical anthropology Elizabeth von Samsonow notes the intense debate over Electra's relevance in the murder of Clytemnestra—Sophocles, for example, viewed her as a key component of the killing while Aeschylus sees her as incidental—but refutes the tendency to shoehorn her motivations into Freud's model. She asks for scholars to reconsider Electra as undergoing vagina-envy, resulting from the woman's powerful and sexually-active position in pre-Hellenic society. By liberating Electra from the male-centric complexes and histories that restrict her motivations, study of mother-daughter relations can evolve into an "outline of a future world." In another of her works, Jacobs, too, writes on the untheorized state of matricide in literature and asks for an expansion of symbolism beyond the classic Oedipean model.

== Relation to the curse of the House of Atreus ==
The House of Atreus began with Tantalus, son of Zeus, who murdered his son, Pelops, and attempted to feed him to the gods. The gods, however, were not tricked and banished Tantalus to the Underworld and brought his son back to life. Later in life Pelops and his family line were cursed by Myrtilus, a son of Hermes, catalyzing the curse of the House of Atreus. Pelops had two children, Atreus and Thyestes, who are said to have killed their half-brother Chrysippus, and were therefore banished.

Thyestes and Aerope, Atreus' wife, were found out to be having an affair, and in an act of vengeance, Atreus murdered his brother's sons, cooked them, and then fed them to Thyestes. Thyestes had a son with his daughter and named him Aegisthus, who went on to kill Atreus.

Atreus' children were Agamemnon, Menelaus, and Anaxibia. Leading up to here, we can see that the curse of the House of Atreus was one forged from murder, incest and deceit, and continued in this way for generations through the family line. To put it simply, the curse demands blood for blood, a never ending cycle of murder within the family.

Those who join the family seem to play a part in the curse as well, as seen in Clytemnestra when she murders her husband Agamemnon, in revenge for sacrificing their daughter, Iphigenia. Orestes, goaded by his sister Electra, murders Clytemnestra in order to exact revenge for her killing his father.

Orestes is said to be the end of the curse of the House of Atreus. The curse holds a major part in the Oresteia and is mentioned in it multiple times, showing that many of the characters are very aware of the curse's existence. Aeschylus was able to use the curse in his play as an ideal formulation of tragedy in his writing.

== Contemporary background ==
Some scholars believe that the trilogy is influenced by contemporary political developments in Athens. A few years previously, legislation sponsored by the democratic reformer Ephialtes had stripped the court of the Areopagus, hitherto one of the most powerful vehicles of upper-class political power, of all of its functions except some minor religious duties and the authority to try homicide cases. By having his story being resolved by a judgment of the Areopagus, Aeschylus may be expressing his approval of this reform. According to a different interpretation, Aeschylus was expressing his disapproval of these very reforms when he had Athena warn the Athenians against "innovative additions to the laws" in Eumenides. It is also possible that Aeschylus was being deliberately ambiguous to appeal to both supporters and opponents of Ephialtes' reforms. It may also be significant that Aeschylus makes Agamemnon lord of Argos, where Homer puts his house, instead of his nearby capitol, Mycenae, since about this time Athens had entered into an alliance with Argos.

== Adaptations ==
=== Key productions ===
In 1981, Sir Peter Hall directed Tony Harrison's adaptation of the trilogy at London's Royal National Theatre, with music by Harrison Birtwistle and stage design by Jocelyn Herbert.

There are many key attributes that make this production so revolutionary for its time, particularly in the choice of staging. When Sir Peter Hall first glimpsed its new Olivier auditorium, which is designed to resemble an ancient Greek amphitheater, an idea long cooking in his head came bursting to the surface. At last he would have the opportunity to stage The Oresteia, and in a space not dissimilar to the one Aeschylus actually used. Hall's use of ancient staging conventions is seen to be a modern interpretation of the theatrical past. Despite being a stylized theater, Hall's adaptation does not stick to a deliberate time period in its setting and costume pieces, making it appear more closely to a revival.

Additionally, the controversial usage of masks in this production sets it apart from any other production. Hall knew for certain was that he wanted all of the characters to represent their unique power and personality in the form of masks, stating, "The Greek Stage is in itself a mask: hideous murders and violence happen behind the scenes; the terror is imagined". Even clippings of Vogue Magazine were used to get a feel behind the characters and styling of each of the masks. Herbert made many different versions of the masks, and worked with the cast and crew for six months to perfect the finalized versions. Benedict Nightgale, a writer for The New York Times, went on to say, "It would be a pity if Mr. Hall followed the advice some London critics have already given him, and abandoned masks altogether, since they rivet the eye and also serve to remind us that the characters are elemental, not psychological beings".

The following year, the production would get brought to the Ancient Theater of Epidaurus, where Hall would get to bring his vision to life in an actual Grecian theater.

In 1999, Katie Mitchell followed him at the same venue (though in the Cottesloe Theatre, where Hall had directed in the Olivier Theatre) with a production which used Ted Hughes' translation. In 2015, Robert Icke's production of his own adaptation was a sold out hit at the Almeida Theatre and was transferred that same year to the West End's Trafalgar Studios. Two other productions happened in the UK that year, in Manchester and at Shakespeare's Globe. The following year, in 2016, playwright Zinnie Harris premiered her adaptation, This Restless House, at the Citizen's Theatre to five-star critical acclaim.

=== Chronology of adaptations ===
- 1894: Spanish composer Manuel Manrique de Lara adapted the trilogy into his own trilogy of symphonic poems, which premiered in 1894.
- 1895: Composer Sergei Taneyev adapted the trilogy into his own operatic trilogy of the same name, which was premiered in 1895.
- 1965-66: Composer Iannis Xenakis adapted vocal work for chorus and 12 instruments.
- 1967: Composer Felix Werder adapted Agamemnon as an opera.
- 1969: The Spaghetti Western The Forgotten Pistolero, is based on the myth and set in Mexico following the Second Mexican Empire. Ferdinando Baldi, who directed the film, was also a professor of classical literature who specialized in Greek tragedy.
- 1974: Rush Rehm's translation of the trilogy was staged at The Pram Factory in Melbourne.
- 2007: Yaël Farber's MoLoRa, a post-apartheid South African adaptation of the Oresteia set during the Truth and Reconciliation Commission hearings. The play was awarded three Naledi Theatre Awards.
- 2008: Theatre professor Ethan Sinnott directed an ASL adaptation of Agamemnon.
- 2008: Dominic Allen and James Wilkes, The Oresteia, for Belt Up Theatre Company.
- 2009: Canadian author Anne Carson's An Oresteia, an adaptation featuring episodes from the Oresteia from three different playwrights: Aeschylus' Agamemnon, Sophocles' Electra, and Euripides' Orestes.
- 2014: French rapper D' de Kabal made his own adaptation of the Oresteia in his rap and hip hop play Agamemnon with the collective R.I.P.O.S.T.E. and the music and theatre artists Arnaud Churin and Emanuela Pace.
- 2016: The trilogy This Restless House by British playwright and director Zinnie Harris revisits the Oresteia, putting women in the center. Part one is Agamemnon's Return, a play of its own premiered in Scotland, followed by The Bough Breaks and Electra And Her Shadow.
- 2019: American playwright Ellen McLaughlin and director Michael Khan's The Oresteia, premiered on April 30, 2019, at the Shakespeare Theatre Company, Washington, DC. The adaptation was shown as a digital production by Theatre for a New Audience in New York City during the COVID-19 Pandemic and was directed by Andrew Watkins.

== Translations ==
- Robert Potter, 1777 - verse: full text
- Thomas Medwin and Percy Bysshe Shelley, 1832–1834 – verse (Pagan Press reprint 2011)
- Robert Browning, 1877 – verse: The Agamemnon of Æschylus (full text available at Wikisource)
- Edmund Doidge Anderson Morshead, 1st ed., 1881 – verse: (full text available at Wikisource)
- Anna Swanwick, 1886 – verse: (full text available at Wikisource)
- Edmund Doidge Anderson Morshead, 2nd ed., 1889 – verse: (full text available at Wikisource)
- John Dunning Cooper, ca.1890 - verse: The Agamemnon, Choephori, and Eumenides Rendered into English verse
- Arthur S. Way, 1906 – verse
- John Stuart Blackie, 1906 – verse
- Edmund Doidge Anderson Morshead, 1909 – verse: full text
- Gilbert Murray, 1920–1925 – verse (full text available at Wikisource: Agamemnon; Choëphoroe; Eumenides)
- Herbert Weir Smyth, 1926, Aeschylus, Vol. II, Loeb Classical Library: Greek text with facing translations – prose (full text available at Wikisource)
- Louis MacNeice, 1936 – verse Agamemnon
- Edith Hamilton, 1937, Three Greek Plays: Prometheus Bound, Agamemnon, The Trojan Women
- Richmond Lattimore, 1953 – "verse"
- F. L. Lucas, 1954 – verse Agamemnon
- Robert A. Johnston, 1955 – verse, an "acting version"
- Philip Vellacott, 1956 – verse
- Paul Roche, 1963 – verse
- Peter Arnott, 1964 – verse
- George Thomson, 1965 – verse
- John Lewin, 1966 (University of Minnesota Press)
- Howard Rubenstein, 1965 – verse Agamemnon
- Hugh Lloyd-Jones, 1970 – verse
- Rush Rehm, 1978 – verse, for the stage
- Robert Fagles, 1975 – verse
- Robert Lowell, 1977 – verse
- Tony Harrison, 1981 – verse
- David Grene and Wendy Doniger O'Flaherty, 1989 – verse
- Peter Meineck, 1998 – verse
- Ted Hughes, 1999 – verse
- Christopher Collard, 2002 – verse
- Ian C. Johnston, 2002 – verse: full text
- George Theodoridis, Agamemnon, Choephori, Eumenides 2005–2007 – prose
- Alan Sommerstein, Aeschylus, Loeb Classical Library, 3 vols. Greek text with facing translations, 2008
- Peter Arcese, 2010 – Agamemnon, in syllabic verse
- Sarah Ruden, 2016 – verse
- David Mulroy, 2018 – verse
- Oliver Taplin, 2018 – verse
- Jeffrey Scott Bernstein and Tom Phillips (illustrator), 2020 – verse

== See also ==
- The Oresteia in the arts and popular culture
- Mourning Becomes Electra – a modernized version of the story by Eugene O'Neill, who shifts the action to the American Civil War
- The Flies – an adaptation of The Libation Bearers by Jean-Paul Sartre, which focuses on human freedom
- Live by the sword, die by the sword – a line from the trilogy

== Bibliography ==
- Collard, Christopher (2002). Introduction to and translation of Oresteia. Oxford University Press. ISBN 0-19-283281-6.
- Goward, Barbara (2005). Aeschylus: Agamemnon. Duckworth Companions to Greek and Roman Tragedy. London: Duckworth. ISBN 978-0-7156-3385-4.
- Himmelhoch, Leah R. (2023). Aeschylus: Agamemnon. London: Bloomsbury Academic. ISBN 9781350154896.
- MacLeod, C. W. (1982). "Politics and the Oresteia". The Journal of Hellenic Studies, vol. 102. doi:10.2307/631132. JSTOR 631132. pp. 124–144.
- Widzisz, Marcel (2012). Chronos on the Threshold: Time, Ritual, and Agency in the Oresteia. Lexington Press. ISBN 978-0-7391-7045-8.
