= Federici =

Federici is a surname. Notable people with the surname include:

- Aldo Federici (1920–1988), Italian ice hockey player
- Adam Federici (born 1985), Australian footballer
- Andrea Federici (born 1997), Italian sprinter
- Anthony Federici (1940–2022), identified as a captain in the Genovese crime family
- Autumn Federici, American model, producer, and actress
- Camillo Federici (1749–1802), Italian actor and playwright
- Cesare Federici (c. 1530-1600/1603), Italian merchant and traveler
- Daniele Federici (born 1988), Italian footballer
- Daniel Paul "Danny" Federici (1950–2008), American musician
- Emanuele Federici (born 1978), Italian lightweight rower
- Fred Joseph Federici III (born 1965), American attorney
- Frederick Federici (1850–1888), Italian-born British opera singer
- Giovanni Battista Federici (1615–1657), Roman Catholic prelate, Bishop of Sagone
- Italia Federici (born 1969), President of the Council of Republicans for Environmental Advocacy
- Luciano Federici (1938–2020), Italian footballer
- Maria Federici (1899–1984), Italian politician
- Nora Federici (1910–2001), Italian statistician
- Olivia Federici (born 1990), British swimmer
- Petrus Federici (1571–1613), Roman Catholic prelate, Bishop of Vulturara e Montecorvino
- Silvia Federici (born 1942), Italian American scholar, teacher, and activist
- William R. Federici (1917–2009), chief justice of the New Mexico Supreme Court
