= Genus (disambiguation) =

In Linnaean taxonomy, genus is the rank between family and species.

Genus may also refer to:

- Genus, a taxonomic rank used for the purpose of cloud classification
- Genus: Journal of Population Sciences, a journal of population genetics founded by Nora Federici
- Genus (mathematics), a classifying property of a mathematical object
  - Genus of a multiplicative sequence
  - Geometric genus
  - In graph embedding, the genus of the graph is the genus of the surface in which it can be embedded
  - In the theory of numerical semigroups, the genus of a numerical semigroup is the cardinality of the set of gaps in the numerical semigroup
  - Genus of a quadratic form
  - The genus of an entire function
- Grammatical gender
- Genus (music), a concept in ancient Greek music theory
- Genus (philosophy)
- Genus (linguistics)
- In Alienators: Evolution Continues, the Genus are monstrous alien organisms that have a high speed evolution
- Genus plc, a British biotechnology company
- Sport Club Genus de Porto Velho, a Brazilian football (soccer) club
- Genera (operating system)

== People ==
- Gennadii Genus (born 1990), Ukrainian track cyclist
- James Genus (born 1966), American jazz bassist
- Sampson Genus (born 1988), American football player

== See also ==
- Gens (disambiguation)
- Gender (disambiguation)
- Genius
