= Genz (disambiguation) =

Genz or similar terms may refer to:

- Genz, a village in Sistan and Baluchestan Province, Iran
- Christoph Genz, a German tenor in opera and concert
- Henrik Ruben Genz, a Danish film director
- Gen Z or Generation Z, people born c. 1997–c. 2012

== See also ==
- Gens (disambiguation)
