= The Suppliants (Aeschylus) =

Play by Aeschylus

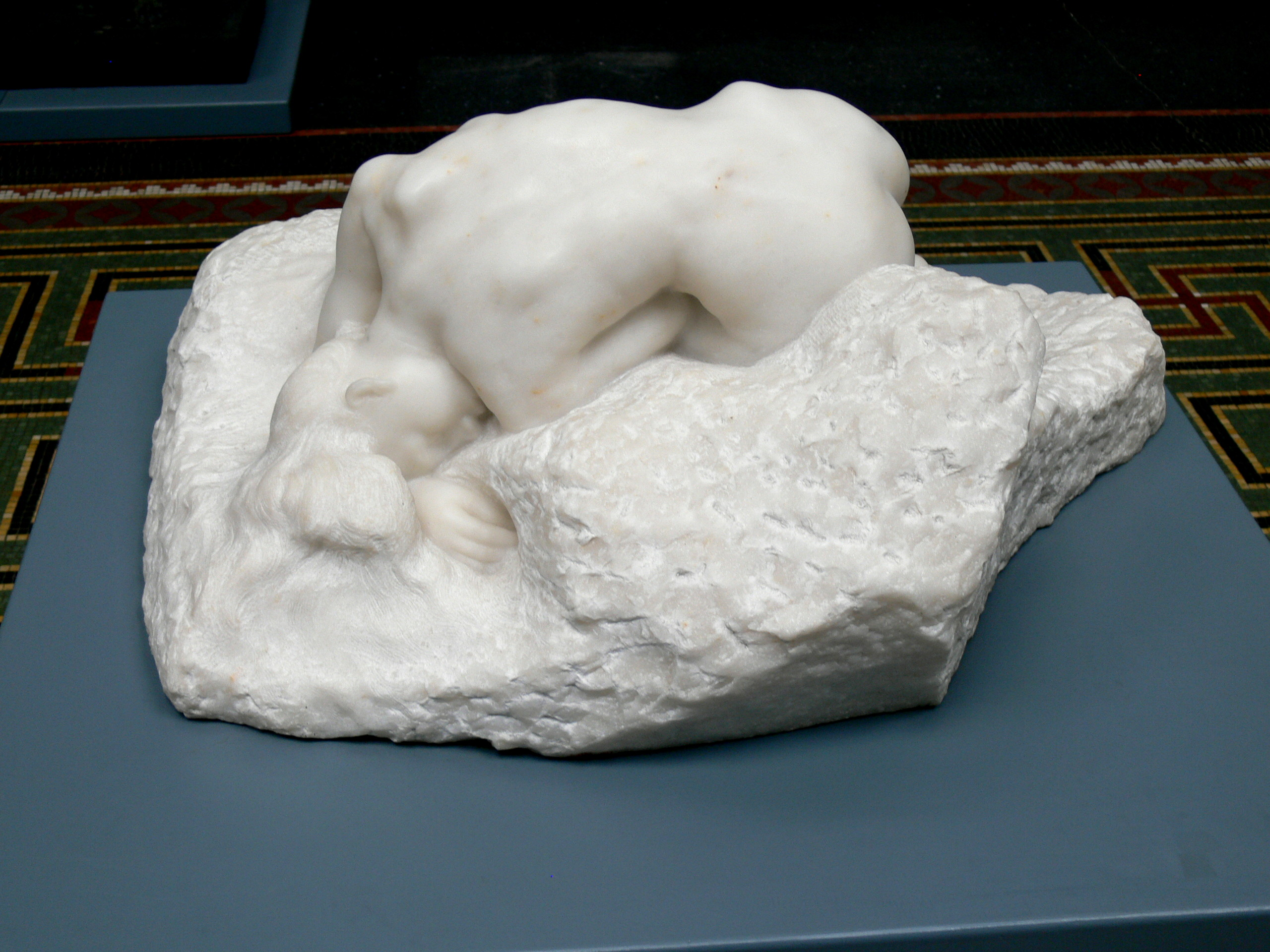
- La Danaide by Auguste Rodin
- Written by: Aeschylus
- Chorus: The Danaïdes
- Characters: Danaus; Pelasgus; Herald of Aegyptus; Attendants
- Genre: Tragedy
- Setting: shore of Argos

The Suppliants (Ancient Greek: Ἱκέτιδες, Hiketides; Latin: Supplices), also called The Suppliant Maidens, The Suppliant Women, or Supplices is a play by Aeschylus. It was probably first performed "only a few years previous to the Oresteia, which was brought out 458 BC." It seems to be the first play in a tetralogy, sometimes referred to as the Danaid Tetralogy, which probably included the lost plays The Egyptians (also called Aigyptioi), and The Daughters of Danaus (also called The Danaïdes or The Danaids), and the satyr play Amymone. It was long thought to be the earliest surviving play by Aeschylus due to the relatively anachronistic function of the chorus as the protagonist of the drama. However, evidence discovered in the mid-twentieth century shows it was one of Aeschylus' last plays, definitely written after The Persians and possibly after Seven Against Thebes. One reason The Suppliants was thought to be an early play was "its preponderance of choral lyric, . . . a succession of choral odes that are among the densest, most opulent, most purely lovely things in all Greek poetry."

Greek tragedies—The Suppliants and Sophocles' Philoctetes, for example—do not always end with the downfall of the protagonist. Rather, the agony of the Danaids in fleeing a forced marriage is essentially tragic. And Pelasgus is faced with the choice of protecting the suppliants, which would likely involve a war with Egypt; or rejecting their plea for protection, which would mean offending Zeus, who supports suppliants, and who might well punish him and his country in response. Furthermore, the suppliants threaten to commit suicide if their plea is rejected, which would bring ritual pollution on the city and its people and draw down the anger of Zeus upon them. The plays ends with the success of the suppliants and the deferral of any war with Egypt. But this is only a temporary reprieve, and the following plays of the tetralogy continue, probably, with a war between Argos and Egypt, followed by other tragic events and dilemmas.

== Plot ==
The Danaids form the chorus and serve as the protagonists. They flee a forced marriage to their Egyptian cousins. When the Danaids reach Argos from Egypt, they take refuge in a sanctuary of several gods, outside the city, and they entreat King Pelasgus to protect them. The girls are descended several generations back from Zeus and Io, an Argive princess seduced by Zeus and then driven by Hera to Egypt, so they claim Argos as their ancestral homeland, and they recognize and supplicate the Greek gods. The Danaids tell King Pelasgus that if he refuses their plea, they will commit suicide by hanging themselves on the statues of the gods at the sanctuary. Pelasgus wants to help them, but he doesn't want to start a war with Egypt. He gives the decision to the Argive people, who unanimously decide in the favour of the Danaids. Danaus rejoices at the outcome, and the Danaids praise the Greek deities. Almost immediately, a herald of the Egyptians comes to attempt to force the Danaids to return to their cousins for marriage. Pelasgus arrives, threatens the herald, and urges the Danaids to remain within the walls of Argos. The play ends with the Danaids retreating into the Argive walls, protected.

== Themes ==
George Thomson, expanding on D. S. Robertson, interpreted the tetralogy as a defence of the Athenian law requiring widows to marry a brother or cousin of their deceased husband in some circumstances in order to keep his property within the family. According to this interpretation, the Danaids' predicament of being forced into a marriage with their cousins would not have generated so much sympathy with the initial audience, which was accustomed to such marriages, as it might today. This is reflected in the question Pelasgus asks of the Danaids' in The Suppliants that echoes Athenian law on the subject: "If the sons of Aigyptos are your masters by the law of the land, claiming to be your next-of-kin, who would wish to oppose them?" Thomson speculates that as Oresteia ends by validating the contemporary Athenian law regarding trial for murder by the court of Areopagus, the Danaid plays may have ended by validating the contemporary Athenian law regarding marriage of next-of-kin when the husband dies without an heir. Thomson further suggests the possibility that as Oresteia's ending dramatizes the establishment of the court of Areopagus, the Danaid plays may have ended by dramatizing the establishment of the festival of the Thesmophoria, a festival reserved for women that was based on the cult of Demeter which, according to Herodotus, was brought to Greece from Egypt by the Danaids.

Ridgeway, on the other hand, interpreted the plays as a dramatization of the conflict between matrilineal and patrilineal inheritance. The French scholars Jean-Pierre Vernant and Pierre Vidal-Naquet argued that the Danaïds objected to cousin marriage because they saw it as incest; this theory has, however, been discredited.

Edith Hall writes,

Aeschylus' Suppliants concerns the shared history of the Argive Greeks and the Egyptians, but at its psychological heart lies the dramatization of violent ethnic confrontation. In its discussion of physical appearance, skin colour, and clothing, as well as in its comparisons of religion, behavioural codes, and political culture, the dialogue richly reflects the interest that mid-fifth-century Greeks had in the different peoples with whom they shared the Mediterranean litoral.

== Lost plays of the tetralogy ==
The remaining plays of the tetralogy have been mostly lost. However, one significant passage from The Danaids has been preserved. This is a speech by the goddess of love Aphrodite praising the marriage between the sky (the groom) and the earth (the bride) from which rain comes, nourishing cattle, corn, and fruits.

As the plot of the remaining plays has been generally reconstructed, following a war with the Aegyptids in which Pelasgus has been killed, Danaus becomes tyrant of Argos. The marriage is forced upon his daughters, but Danaus instructs them to murder their husbands on their wedding night. All do except for Hypermnestra, whose husband, Lynceus, flees. Danaus imprisons or threatens to kill Hypermnestra for her disobedience, but Lynceus reappears and kills Danaus; Lynceus becomes the new king of Argos, with Hypermnestra as his queen. Opinions differ as to the ending, although certainly Aphrodite was involved in the denouement. One opinion is that Lynceus now must decide how to punish the forty-nine homicidal Danaids, when Aphrodite appears in deus ex machina fashion and absolves them of the murders, as they were obeying their father; she then persuades them to abandon their celibate ways, and the trilogy closes with their marriages to forty-nine local Argive men. An alternative opinion is that Hypermnestra is put on trial for disobeying her father and Aphrodite successfully defends her similarly to Apollo's defense of Orestes in Oresteia. The trilogy was followed by the satyr play Amymone, which comically portrayed a seduction of one of the Danaids by Poseidon.

== Sources ==
- F. A. Paley, Aeschylus Translated into English Prose., Cambridge, 1864
- F. A. Paley, The Tragedies of Aeschylus., London, 1879
- Friis Johansen, H. and Whittle, E.W. Aeschylus: The Suppliants. 3 vols. Copenhagen, 1980.
- Garvie, A.F. Aeschylus' Supplices, Play and Trilogy. Cambridge, 1969.
- Sommerstein, Alan. Aeschylean Tragedy. Bari, 1996.

== Translations & Adaptations ==
- Robert Potter, 1777 - verse: full text
- Theodore Alois Buckley, 1849 - prose: full text
- F. A. Paley, 1855 - prose: full text
- F. A. Paley, 1864 - prose: full text
- E. D. A. Morshead, 1883 - verse: (full text available at Wikisource)
- Anna Swanwick, 1886 - verse: (full text available at Wikisource)
- E. D. A. Morshead, 1908, 2nd ed. - verse: (full text available at Wikisource)
- Walter George Headlam and C. E. S. Headlam, 1909 - prose
- G. M. Cookson, 1922 - verse: (full text available at Wikisource)
- Herbert Weir Smyth, 1922 - prose: (full text available at Wikisource)
- Gilbert Murray, 1930 - verse: full text
- S. G. Benardete, 1956 - verse
- Philip Vellacott, 1961 - verse
- Peter Burian, 1991 - verse
- Charles L. Mee, Big Love, 2000 (modern adaptation)
- Christopher Collard, 2008
- George Theodoridis, 2009 - prose: full text
- Ian C. Johnston, 2013, verse: full text
