= Maria Maddalena Rossi =

Italian politician (1906–1995)

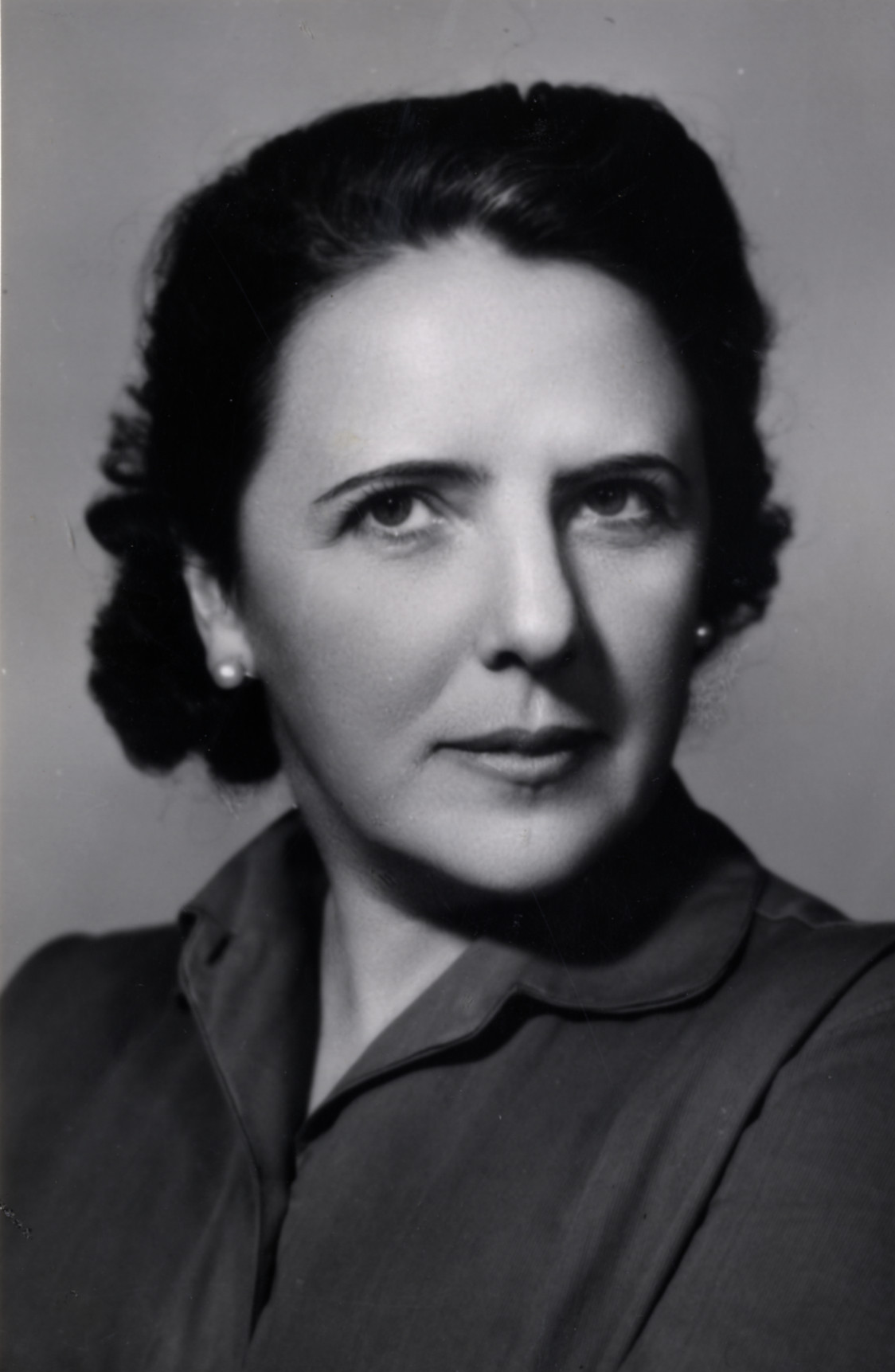
- Official portrait, 1948

Member of the Chamber of Deputies
- In office 8 May 1948 – 15 May 1963
- Constituency: Verona (1948–1953); Siena (1953–1963)

Member of the Constituent Assembly
- In office 25 June 1946 – 31 January 1948
- Constituency: Verona

Mayor of Portovenere
- In office 1970–1975
- Preceded by: Giovanni Mariotti
- Succeeded by: Mauro Lotti

Personal details
- Born: 29 September 1906 Codevilla, Kingdom of Italy
- Died: 19 September 1995 (aged 88) Milan, Italy
- Party: Italian Communist Party
- Education: University of Pavia
- Occupation: Partisan; politician; journalist
- Profession: Chemist

Maria Maddalena Rossi (29 September 1906 – 19 September 1995) was an Italian anti-fascist partisan, communist politician, feminist, and journalist. She was a leading voice for leftist women and women's rights in the years following the Second World War.

== Biography ==
=== Early life ===
Born on 29 September 1906 in Codevilla (presently in the Province of Pavia) into a well-to-do and anti-fascist family, she graduated in chemistry from the University of Pavia in 1930, then moved to Milan where she found a job.

=== Politic involvement ===
In 1937, she joined the underground Communist Party of Italy alongside her husband Antonio Semproni, where she undertook her military service in the anti-fascist struggle. In particular, she became involved in the Red Rescue (International) – activities mainly carried out by women – which worked with communist prisoners through solidarity campaigns.

In 1942, she was arrested by the fascist military police in Bergamo and sentenced to detention in the prison of Sant'Angelo in Vado (Pesaro), until 25 July 1943. She then moved to Zurich, Switzerland, where she continued to work for the Italian Communist Party for about a year and a half, raising funds for the party's armed struggle, and writing for the anti-fascist newspapers “L'Italia Libera", "La Libertà" and “Fronte della gioventù per l'Independenza" for Italian prisoners in Swiss camps.

In December 1944, she returned to Milan and joined the editorial staff of the left-wing daily L'Unità, which was then underground. She then joined the Press and Propaganda Commission of the Italian High Directorate of the PCI and became head of the Women's Commission of the PCI Upper Italy.

In the Italian constituent elections of 1946, she was elected to the Constituent Assembly of the Italian Republic as part of the Communist Group, an assembly whose aim was to establish a new constitution after the fascist dictatorship: she was one of the first twenty-one women to be elected to an Italian parliamentary assembly. In particular, she fought for the repeal of the article of the pre-fascist laws that prohibited women from entering the highest ranks of the judiciary. When, during the debate on the new Italian constitution, Piero Calamandrei spoke out against the equality of spouses and in favor of affirming the indissolubility of marriage, Rossi retorted that women were now a force in Italian politics and that they intended to change the entire civil code.

In this role, she was a member of the Commission on International Treaties and Discussions for the Peace Treaty between Italy and the Allies, signed on 10 February 1947 in Paris. In it, it defends the idea that, in addition to the peace treaty, a policy of reconciliation and collaboration is necessary to achieve lasting peace. Maria Maddalena Rossi was re-elected in 1948 for the First Legislature of the Italian Republic – where she distinguished herself in her fight for minors and the streamlining of adoption procedures – in 1953 for the Second Legislature and in 1958 for the Third Legislature, which lasted until 15 May 1963.

In particular, she fought for equality between women and men within the family home and in the professional world, with Maria Federici and Teresa Mateti she campaigned for Italian women to have equal access to justice, and also promoted the idea that the State had a responsibility to protect the family and moral and civil equality between spouses.

At the beginning of the 1950s, the Italian Communist Party took charge of denouncing the living conditions in the Cassino region in southern Italy, which were still difficult even several years after the end of the Second World War. The Associazione donne del Cassinate was created in order to defend women who had suffered sexual violence during the war – especially the Moroccanate – and to bring before Parliament specific directives for the social and economic rights of these women. On 7 April 1952 in Rome, Maria Maddalena Rossi, accompanied by a delegation of five hundred women, to make changes to the compensation due to victims of war crimes committed by Allied soldiers during the Second World War. This militant action has created a political, ideological and cultural divide: women victims of sexual violence have been able to break with the social shame of the sexual crimes they have suffered, which engenders a form of emancipation in the face of a patriarchal society in a return to traditional norms to compensate for the social and gender transformations due to the war. The specificity of sexual violence has become established on the political scene, which has given impetus to the idea that this violence is a collective issue and not the responsibility of the victims. During this evening session in the Chamber of Deputies, Maria Maddalena Rossi said:

"But on another aspect of the problem I want to dwell on it for a few minutes. The honorable Secretary of State did not want - at least I understood this - to commit himself to any changes to the existing law. He says that he does not even see the need to outline what could be a change in the existing law, the limits of which we are well aware. Now, if the honorable Secretary considers that the torture inflicted on these women by Moroccan troops is in any way comparable to any other misfortune that war can bring, however great it may be (and I say this having here next to me a colleague who had the misfortune of losing her son in the war), If he believes that this misfortune is comparable to any other mourning or pain that war causes, he shows that he does not have an ounce of sensitivity, he shows that he does not even know how to pause for a moment to consider the fact that chance and nothing else has willed that these women and not those of his family, those who are dearest to him, should have to suffer this harsh fate.

Do you think that the lives of these women would be affected to the same extent if they had lost one of their loved ones in the war? No, it's not the same. We know the mothers who have lost their children, the wives who have lost their husbands: we love them, we honor them, we show them our full solidarity, so that they sometimes find a kind of comfort in knowing that their mourning is shared, that the memory of their departed loved ones is sacred to millions of citizens. But these women don't! For these there is no possible comfort. They have to hide, as if they felt morally infected as well! These women would like to be forbidden to speak of their misfortune, to assemble, to complain, in the name of public morality! Moreover, she compared this misfortune to that of a person who loses a relative in a car accident or I don't know what others. Mr Under-Secretary, if you will allow me, you should not have said that. This misfortune must not be compared with others, whether small or large, nor should it be placed in the category of "accidents". Otherwise, it is no longer enough to talk about insensitivity, because that would be cynicism.".

On 30 January 1955, she took part in the 10th anniversary of the legislation on women's suffrage in Italy.

In 1963, she was no longer a parliamentarian and became a municipal councilor and for public works. Then, between 1970 and 1975, she was elected mayor of Porto Venere (La Spezia) where she settled.

=== Associative involvement ===
In parallel with her political commitments, Maria Maddalena Rossi is involved in the associative field. She was one of the main representatives of the Unione Donne Italiane, of which she became president from 1947 to 1956. It is a feminist association fighting for women's rights, especially through peace demonstrations with a pro-Soviet orientation.

Between 1957 and 1967, she was vice-president of the Women's International Democratic Federation.

In December 1897, in recognition of his political, civil and social commitment, the Province of Milan awarded him the Gold Medal.

=== End of Life ===
Finally, on 19 September 1995, Maria Maddalena Rossi died in Milan and was buried in her hometown of Codevilla (Pavia). She bequeathed her important collection of contemporary art objects, books and records to the city. Then, in his memory, a street in Codevilla was named after him: since then, several ceremonies have been held in his honor.

On 29 September 2020, the inauguration of a municipal nursery school in the town of Cassino, named "Asilo Nido Maria Maddalena Rossi" took place, in memory of his struggles for the children and women of this region after the Second World War.

== Electoral history ==
| Election | House | Constituency | Party | Votes | Result |
|---|---|---|---|---|---|
| 1946 | Constituent Assembly | Verona–Padova–Vicenza–Rovigo | PCI | 11,842 | Elected |
| 1948 | Chamber of Deputies | Verona–Padova–Vicenza–Rovigo | FDP | 56,589 | Elected |
| 1953 | Chamber of Deputies | Siena–Arezzo–Grosseto | PCI | 20,341 | Elected |
| 1958 | Chamber of Deputies | Siena–Arezzo–Grosseto | PCI | 12,277 | Elected |
