= The Persians =

Classical Greek tragedy by Aeschylus

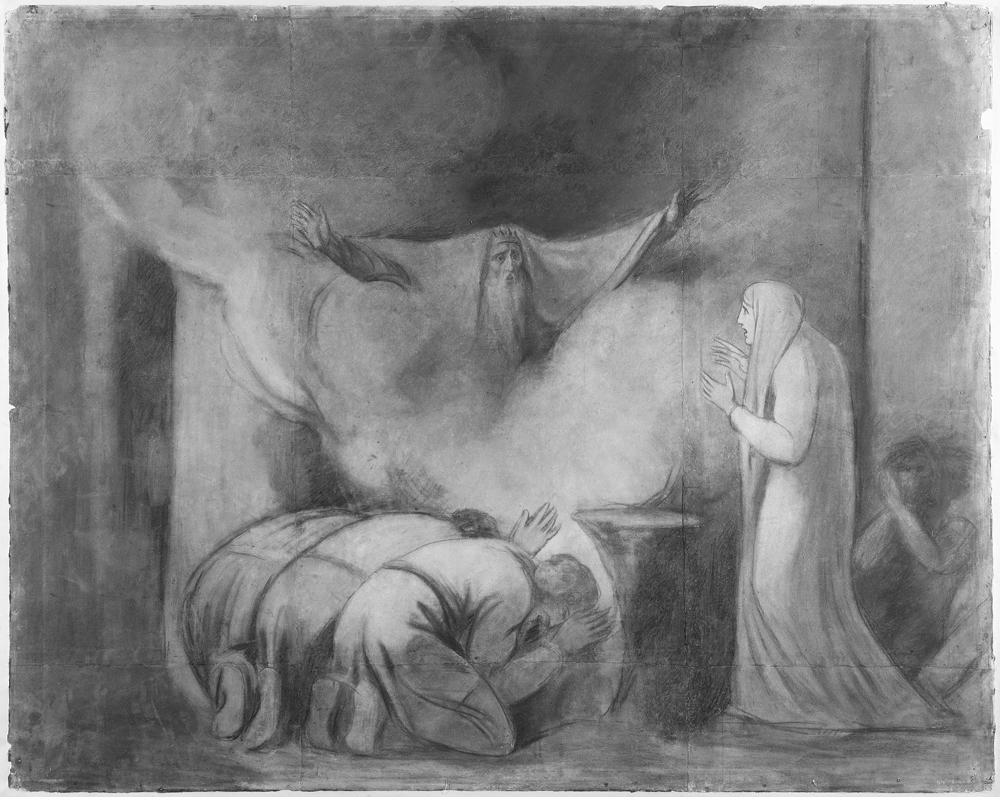
- Drawing by George Romney: The Ghost of Darius Appearing to Atossa
- Written by: Aeschylus
- Chorus: Persian Elders
- Characters: Atossa; Messenger; Ghost of Darius; Xerxes
- Original language: Ancient Greek
- Setting: Susa

Premiere
- Date premiered: 472 BC
- Place premiered: Athens

The Persians (Ancient Greek: Πέρσαι, romanized: Pérsai, Latinised as Persae) is an ancient Greek tragedy written during the Classical period of Ancient Greece by the Greek tragedian Aeschylus. It is the second and only surviving part of a now otherwise lost trilogy that won the first prize at the dramatic competitions in Athens' City Dionysia festival in 472 BC, with Pericles serving as choregos. It is Aeschylus' oldest surviving play, and, by extension, the oldest surviving piece of ancient Greek drama.

== Place in Aeschylus' work ==
The first play in the trilogy, called Phineus, presumably dealt with Jason and the Argonauts' rescue of King Phineus from the torture that the monstrous harpies inflicted at the behest of Zeus. The subject of the third play, Glaucus, was either a mythical Corinthian king who was devoured by his horses because he angered the goddess Aphrodite (see Glaucus (son of Sisyphus)) or else a Boeotian farmer who ate a magical herb that transformed him into a sea deity with the gift of prophecy (see Glaucus).

In The Persians, Xerxes invites the gods' enmity for his hubristic expedition against Greece in 480/79 BC; the focus of the drama is the defeat of Xerxes' navy at Salamis. Given Aeschylus' propensity for writing connected trilogies, the theme of divine retribution may connect the three. Aeschylus himself had fought the Persians at Marathon (490 BC). He may even have fought at Salamis, just eight years before the play was performed.

The satyr play following the trilogy was Prometheus Pyrkaeus, translated as either Prometheus the Fire-lighter or Prometheus the Fire-kindler, which comically portrayed the titan's theft of fire. Several fragments of Prometheus Pyrkaeus are extant, and according to Plutarch, one of those fragments was a statement by Prometheus warning a satyr who wanted to kiss and embrace the fire that he would "mourn for his beard" if he did. Another fragment from Prometheus Pyrkaeus was translated by Herbert Weir Smyth as "And do thou guard thee well lest a blast strike thy face; for it is sharp, and deadly-scorching its hot breaths".

== Summary ==
The Persians takes place in Susa, which at the time was one of the capitals of the Persian Empire, and opens with a chorus of old men of Susa, who are soon joined by the Queen Mother, Atossa, as they await news of her son King Xerxes' expedition against the Greeks. Expressing her anxiety and unease, Atossa narrates "what is probably the first dream sequence in European theatre." This is an unusual beginning for a tragedy by Aeschylus; normally the chorus would not appear until slightly later, after a speech by a minor character.

An exhausted messenger arrives, who offers a graphic description of the Battle of Salamis and its gory outcome. He tells of the Persian defeat, the names of the Persian generals who have been killed, and that Xerxes had escaped and will return. The climax of the messenger's speech is his rendition of the battle cry of the Greeks as they charged:

On, sons of Greece! Set free
Your fatherland, set free your children, wives,
Places of your ancestral gods and tombs of your ancestors!
Forward for all

In the original, this reads:

ὦ παῖδες Ἑλλήνων ἴτε,
ἐλευθεροῦτε πατρίδ', ἐλευθεροῦτε δὲ
παῖδας, γυναῖκας, θεῶν τέ πατρῴων ἕδη,
θήκας τε προγόνων: νῦν ὑπὲρ πάντων ἀγών.

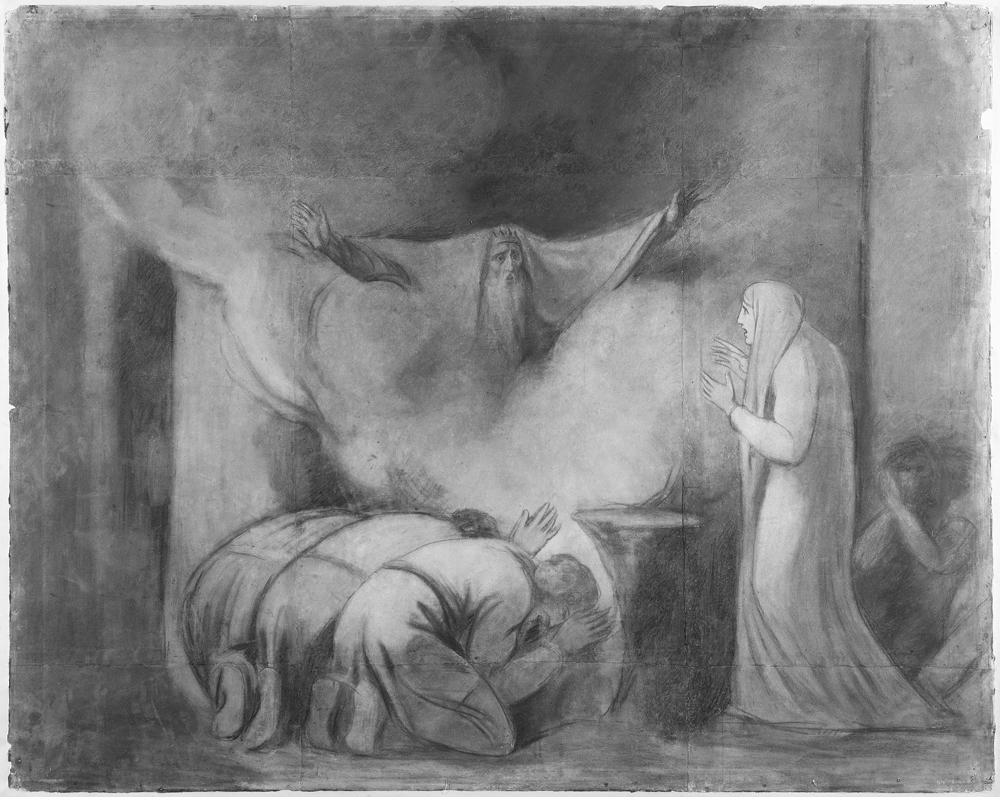
"The Ghost of Darius Appearing to Atossa", drawing by George Romney.

At the tomb of her dead husband Darius, Atossa asks the chorus to summon his ghost: "Some remedy he knows, perhaps,/Knows ruin's cure" they say. On learning of the Persian defeat, Darius condemns the hubris behind his son's decision to invade Greece. He particularly rebukes an impious Xerxes’ decision to build a bridge over the Hellespont to expedite the Persian army's advance. Before departing, the ghost of Darius prophesies another Persian defeat at the Battle of Plataea (479 BC): "Where the plain grows lush and green,/Where Asopus' stream plumps rich Boeotia's soil,/The mother of disasters awaits them there,/Reward for insolence, for scorning God."

Xerxes finally arrives, dressed in torn robes ("grief swarms," the Queen says just before his arrival, "but worst of all it stings / to hear how my son, my prince, / wears tatters, rags" (845–849)) and reeling from his crushing defeat. The rest of the drama (908–1076) consists of the king alone with the chorus engaged in a lyrical kommós that laments the enormity of Persia's defeat.

== Discussion ==
Aeschylus was not the first to write a play about the Persians — his older contemporary Phrynichus wrote two plays about them. The first, The Sack of Miletus (written in 493 BC, 21 years before Aeschylus' play), concerned the destruction of an Ionian colony of Athens in Asia Minor by the Persians. For his portrayal of this brutal defeat, which emphasized Athens' abandonment of its colony, Phrynichus was fined and a law passed forbidding subsequent performances of his play. The second, Phoenician Women (written in 476 BC, four years before Aeschylus' version), treated the same historical event as Aeschylus' Persians. Neither of Phrynichus' plays have survived.

Interpretations of Persians either read the play as sympathetic toward the defeated Persians or else as a celebration of Greek victory within the context of an ongoing war. The sympathetic school has the considerable weight of Aristotelian criticism behind it; indeed, every other extant Greek tragedy arguably invites an audience's sympathy for one or more characters on stage. The celebratory school argues that the play is part of a xenophobic culture that would find it difficult to sympathize with its hated barbarian enemy during a time of war. During the play, Xerxes calls his pains "a joy to my enemies" (line 1034).

== Subsequent production history ==
Detail from the front cover of the programme to Peter Sellars' 1993 production of the play.

According to a scholium at Aristophanes' Frogs 1028, Hiero of Syracuse at some point invited Aeschylus to reproduce The Persians in Sicily.

Seventy years after the play was produced, the comic playwright Aristophanes mentions an apparent Athenian reproduction of The Persians in his Frogs (405 BC). In it, he has Aeschylus describe The Persians as "an effective sermon on the will to win. Best thing I ever wrote"; while Dionysus says that he "loved that bit where they sang about the days of the great Darius, and the chorus went like this with their hands and cried 'Wah! Wah!'" (1026–28).

The Persians was popular in the Roman Empire and Byzantine Empire, who also fought wars with the Persians, and its popularity has endured in modern Greece. According to Anthony Podlecki, during a production at Athens in 1965 the audience "rose to its feet en masse and interrupted the actors' dialogue with cheers."

The American Peter Sellars directed a production of The Persians at the Edinburgh Festival and the Los Angeles Festival in 1993, which presented the play as a response to the Gulf War of 1990–1991. The production was in a new translation by Robert Auletta. It opened at the Royal Lyceum Theatre on 16 August 1993. Hamza El Din composed and performed its music, with additional music by Ben Halley Jr. and sound design by Bruce Odland and Sam Auinger. Dunya Ramicova designed the costumes and James F. Ingalls the lighting. Cordelia Gonzalez played Atossa, Howie Seago the Ghost of Darius, and John Ortiz played Xerxes. The Chorus was performed by Ben Halley Jr, Joseph Haj, and Martinus Miroto.

Ellen McLaughlin translated Persians in 2003 for Tony Randall's National Actors Theatre in New York as a response to George Bush's invasion of Iraq. The production starred Len Cariou as Darius and Michael Stuhlbarg as Xerxes.

A 2010 translation by Aaron Poochigian included for the first time the detailed notes for choral odes that Aeschylus himself created, which directed lines to be spoken by specific parts of the chorus (strophe and antistrophe). Using Poochigian's edition, which includes theatrical notes and stage directions, "Persians" was presented in a staged read-through as part of New York's WorkShop Theater Company's Spring 2011 one-act festival "They That Have Borne the Battle."

Also in 2010, Kaite O'Reilly's award-winning translation was produced on Sennybridge Training Area (a military range in the Brecon Beacons) by National Theatre Wales. Audiences valued the way this production required them to shift their attention between the spectacular landscape surrounding them, the particular history of the area, and the modern adaptation of the ancient Greek text performed onstage. The work went on to win O'Reilly the Ted Hughes Award for New Work in Poetry, presented by the Poet Laureate, Carol Ann Duffy.

Οn the occasion of the 2500th anniversary of the Battle of Salamis, on July 25, 2020, Persians was the first Ancient Greek tragedy that was played at its natural environment, i.e. the open-air theatre of Epidaurus, and was live streamed internationally via YouTube. The play was a production of the Hellenic National Theatre and was directed by Dimitrios Lignadis as part of the Epidaurus Festival. Actors delivered the play in Ancient and Modern Greek, while English subtitles were projected on YouTube.

The play is currently in production as one of a double bill in the 2022 Cambridge Greek Play.

In March 2024 Dublin's Abbey Theatre staged the first Irish language translation of the play by poet Nuala Ní Dhomhnaill.

== Influence ==
Aeschylus' drama was a model for Percy Bysshe Shelley's 1821 Hellas: A Lyrical Drama, his final published poetical work before his death in 1822. T. S. Eliot, in The Waste Land, "The Burial of the Dead", line 63 "I had not thought Death had undone so many" echoed line 432 of the Messenger account in The Persians: "However, you can be sure that so great a multitude of men never perished in a single day", which is also similar to Dante's line in Inferno, Canto III, lines 56–57: ch'i' non averei creduto/Che morte tanta n'avesse disfatta.

In modern literature, Dimitris Lyacos in his dystopian epic Z213: Exit uses quotations from the Messenger's account in The Persians (δίψῃ πονοῦντες, οἱ δ᾽ ὑπ᾽ ἄσθματος κενοὶ: some, faint from thirst, while some of us, exhausted and panting) in order to convey the failure of a military operation and the subsequent retreat of the troops in a post-apocalyptic setting. The excerpts from The Persians enter a context of fragmentation whereby broken syntax is evocative of a landscape in the aftermath of war.

== Translations into English ==
- Robert Potter, 1777 – verse: (full text available at Wikisource)
- Anna Swanwick, 1886 – verse: (full text available at Wikisource)
- E. D. A. Morshead, 1908 – verse: (full text available at Wikisource)
- Walter George Headlam and C. E. S. Headlam, 1909 – prose
- G. M. Cookson, 1922 – verse: (full text available at Wikisource)
- Herbert Weir Smyth, 1922 – prose: (full text available at Wikisource)
- Gilbert Murray, 1939 – verse
- Seth G. Benardete, 1956 – verse
- Philip Vellacott, 1961 – verse
- Ted Hughes, 1971 – incorporated into Orghast
- Janet Lembke and C.J. Herington, 1981
- Frederic Raphael and Kenneth McLeish, 1991
- Edith Hall, 1996
- Ellen McLaughlin, 2004 – verse
- George Theodoridis, 2009 – prose: full text
- Aaron Poochigian, 2010 – verse
- Ian C. Johnston, 2012 – verse: full text
- James Romm, 2016 – verse
