= Hubris =

Extreme pride or overconfidence

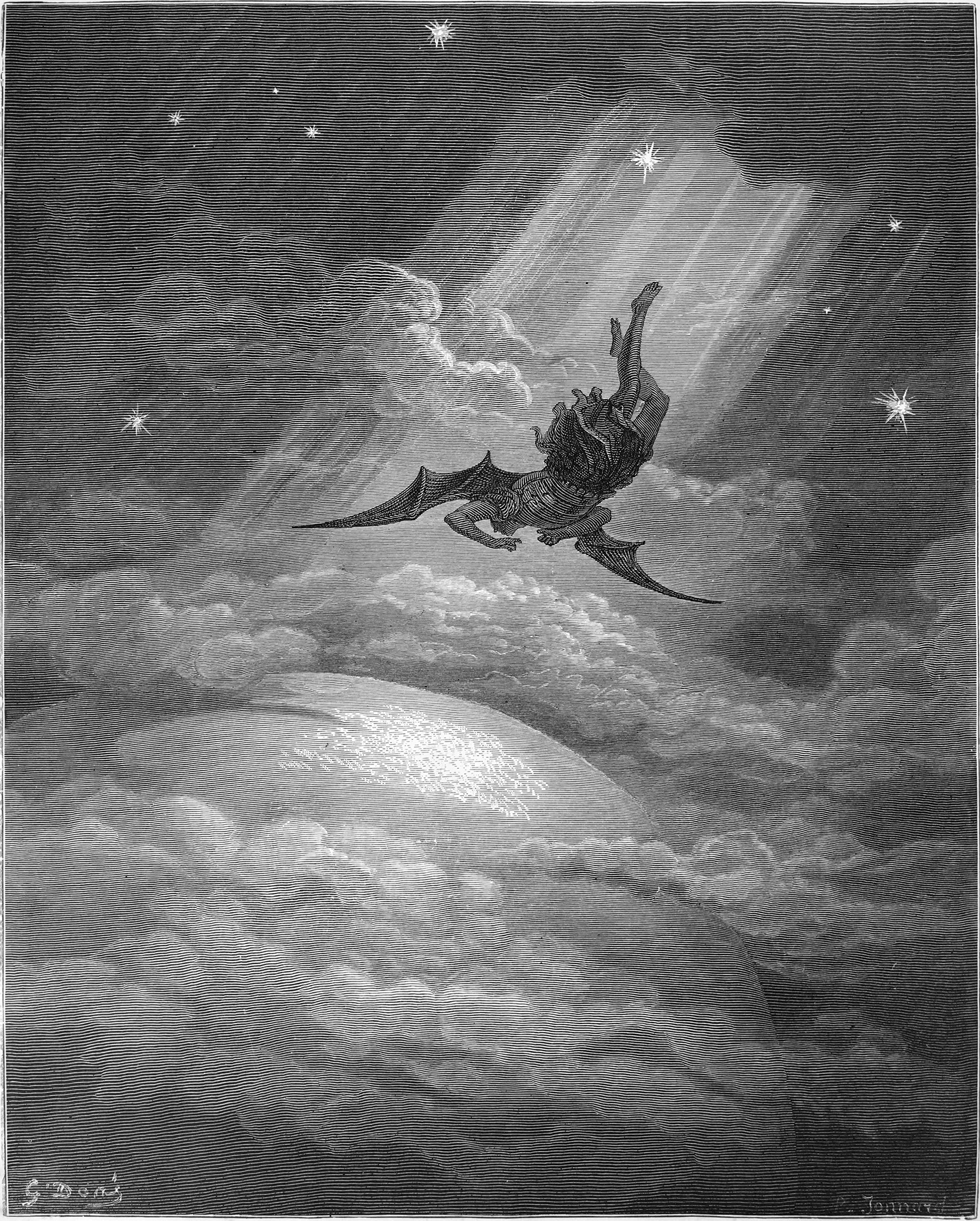
Illustration for John Milton's Paradise Lost by Gustave Doré (1866). The spiritual descent of Lucifer into Satan is one of the most famous examples of hubris.

Hubris (/ˈhjuːbrɪs/; from Ancient Greek ὕβρις (húbris) 'pride, insolence, outrage'), or less frequently hybris (/ˈhaɪbrɪs/), is extreme or excessive pride or dangerous overconfidence and complacency, often in combination with (or synonymous with) arrogance.

Hubris, arrogance, and pretension are related to the need for victory (even if it does not always mean winning) instead of reconciliation, which "friendly" groups might promote. Hubris is usually perceived as a characteristic of an individual rather than a group, although the group the offender belongs to may suffer collateral consequences from wrongful acts. Hubris often indicates a loss of contact with reality and an overestimation of one's own competence, accomplishments, or capabilities.

The term hubris originated in Ancient Greek, where it had several different meanings depending on the context. In legal usage, it meant assault or sexual crimes and theft of public property, and in religious usage it meant emulation of divinity or transgression against a god.

== Ancient Greek origin ==
In ancient Greek, hubris referred to "outrage": actions that violated natural order, or which shamed and humiliated the victim, sometimes for the pleasure or gratification of the abuser.

=== Mythological usage ===
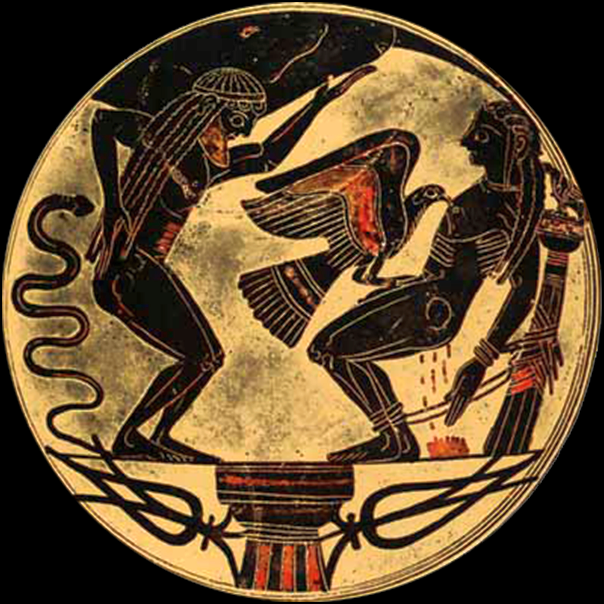
Black-figure pottery (550 BC) depicting Prometheus serving his sentence, tied to a column

Hesiod and Aeschylus used the word "hubris" to describe transgressions against the gods. A common way that hubris was committed was when a mortal claimed to be better than a god in a particular skill or attribute. Claims like these were rarely left unpunished, and so Arachne, a talented young weaver, was transformed into a spider when she said that her skills exceeded those of the goddess Athena. Additional examples include Oedipus, Icarus, Phaethon, Salmoneus, Niobe, Cassiopeia, Tantalus, Bellerophon, and Tereus.

The goddess Hybris is described in the Encyclopædia Britannica Eleventh Edition as having "insolent encroachment upon the rights of others".

These events were not limited to myth, and certain figures in history were considered to have been punished for committing hubris through their arrogance. One such person was the king Xerxes I as portrayed in Aeschylus's play The Persians, and who allegedly threw chains to bind the Hellespont sea as punishment for daring to destroy his fleet.

What is common in all of these examples is the breaching of limits, as the Greeks believed that the Fates (Μοῖραι) had assigned each being with a particular area of freedom, an area that even the gods could not breach.

=== Legal usage ===
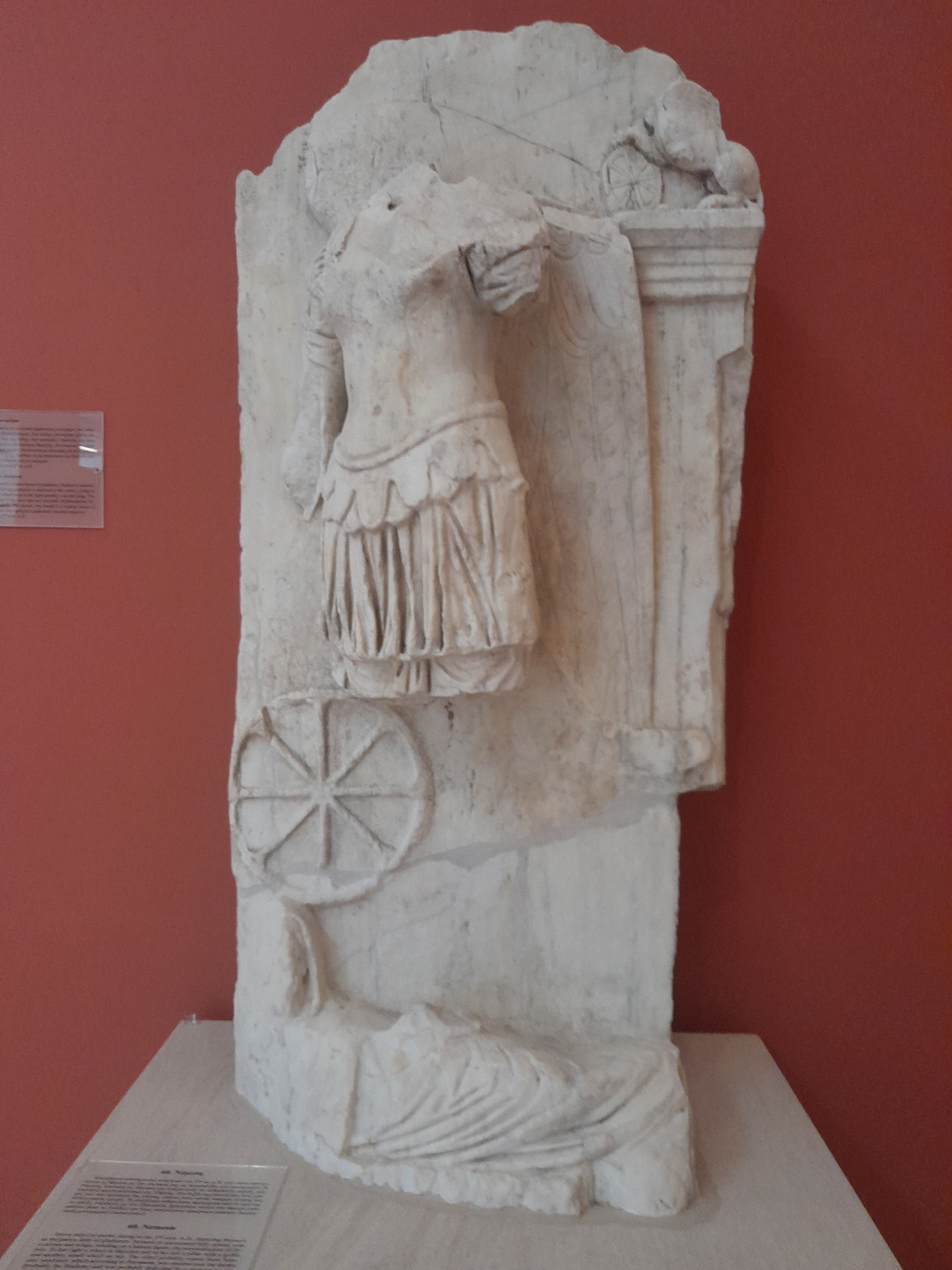
Votive relief of Nemesis as protector of gladiators treading on Hubris, 2nd-century, Archaeological Museum of Patras, Greece

In ancient Athens, hubris was defined as the use of violence to shame the victim (this sense of hubris could also characterize rape). In legal terms, hubristic violations of the law included what might today be termed assault-and-battery, sexual crimes, or the theft of public or sacred property. In some contexts, the term had a sexual connotation. Shame was frequently reflected upon the perpetrator, as well.

Crucial to this definition are the ancient Greek concepts of honour (τιμή, timē) and shame (αἰδώς, aidōs). The concept of honour included not only the exaltation of the one receiving honour, but also the shaming of the one overcome by the act of hubris. This concept of honour is akin to a zero-sum game. Rush Rehm simplifies this definition of hubris to the contemporary concept of "insolence, contempt, and excessive violence".

Two well-known cases are found in the speeches of Demosthenes, a prominent statesman and orator in ancient Greece. These two examples occurred when first Midias punched Demosthenes in the face in the theatre (Against Midias), and second when (in Against Conon) a defendant allegedly assaulted a man and crowed over the victim. Yet another example of hubris appears in Aeschines' Against Timarchus, where the defendant, Timarchus, is accused of breaking the law of hubris by submitting himself to prostitution and anal intercourse. Aeschines brought this suit against Timarchus to bar him from the rights of political office and his case succeeded. Aristotle defined hubris as shaming the victim, not because of anything that happened to the committer or might happen to the committer, but merely for that committer's own gratification:

to cause shame to the victim, not in order that anything may happen to you, nor because anything has happened to you, but merely for your own gratification. Hubris is not the requital of past injuries; this is revenge. As for the pleasure in hubris, its cause is this: naive men think that by ill-treating others they make their own superiority the greater.

=== Early Christianity ===
In the Septuagint, the "hubris is overweening pride, superciliousness or arrogance, often resulting in fatal retribution or nemesis". The word hubris as used in the New Testament parallels the Hebrew word pesha, meaning "transgression". It represents a pride that "makes a man defy God", sometimes to the degree that he considers himself an equal.

== Modern usage ==
In its modern usage, hubris denotes overconfident pride combined with arrogance. Hubris is also referred to as "pride that blinds" because it often causes a committer of hubris to act in foolish ways that belie common sense.

=== Arrogance ===
The Oxford English Dictionary defines "arrogance" in terms of "high or inflated opinion of one's own abilities, importance, etc., that gives rise to presumption or excessive self-confidence, or to a feeling or attitude of being superior to others [...]." Adrian Davies sees arrogance as more generic and less severe than hubris.

== See also ==
- Overconfidence effect
