= Suppliant Women =

Suppliant Women may refer to:

- The Suppliants (Aeschylus) by Aeschylus, an ancient Greek play in which the Danaides seek protection from King Pelasgus
- The Suppliants (Euripides) by Euripides, an ancient Greek play in which the mothers of the Seven Against Thebes seek help from Theseus to bury their sons
