= The Suppliant Women =

The Suppliant Women may refer to:

- The Suppliants (Aeschylus) by Aeschylus, an ancient Greek play where the Danaides seek protection from King Pelasgus
- The Suppliants (Euripides) by Euripides, an ancient Greek play where the mothers of the Seven Against Thebes seek help from Theseus to bury their sons
