= Against Meidias =

Oration by Demosthenes (c. 361 BC)

"Against Meidias" (Ancient Greek: Κατὰ Μειδίου) is one of the most famous judicial orations of the prominent Athenian statesman and orator Demosthenes.

== Background ==
Meidias, a wealthy Athenian, punched Demosthenes—who, at the time served as a patron (choregos) of the Greater Dionysia festival—in the face at the theater of Dionysos in 348 BC. The assault was the result of a long-standing feud between the two. Meidias was a friend of Eubulus and supporter of the unsuccessful excursion in Euboea. He also was an old enemy of the orator, forcibly entering Demosthenes' house along with his brother Thrasylochus in 361 BC, in order to take possession of it. Upon breaking into his home, Demosthenes, his sister, and his mother were subjected to verbal abuse. This incident, along with the assault, forms the basis for Demosthenes' speech.

== The oration ==
Demosthenes made no resistance to Meidias' violation of the place and occasion, but after the festival, when at a special meeting of the Assembly, he entered a complaint against Meidias. The orator wrote the judicial speech "Against Meidias", but he probably never pronounced it. He retired his accusation probably for political reasons although Aeschines maintained that Demosthenes received money to drop the case.

"Against Meidias" is regarded as one of the most intriguing forensic speeches to survive. It gives valuable information about Athenian law and festivals, and especially about the Greek concept of hubris (aggravated assault), which was regarded as a crime not only against the citizen or city but against society as a whole. Demosthenes' speech serves as additional evidence to his autonomy, independence, and legal wit. He could have conducted a private process against Meidias based on the assault charge, or a public procedure based on the shock of being a victim of hubris, but he decided to make it a public cause on the basis of the offense he was subjected to.

As Galen O. Rowe points out, "the single most important recurrence in the speech is the root of hubris in its various grammatical forms and parts of speech. In fact hubris, to use the noun for every manifestation of the root, occurs in the speech 131 times, as opposed to 274 times in the entire Demosthenic corpus and 170 times in all the other Greek orators". This speech also gives valuable information about Athenian law. The orator underscores that a democratic state perishes, if the law is undermined by wealthy and unscrupulous men, and asserts that the citizens acquire power and authority in all state-affairs due "to the strength of the laws".

J. H. Vince asserts that while the speech is indisputably authentic, it seems improbable that it was published by Demosthenes himself. According to the same scholar, "the speech is notable as being the earliest in which the Demosthenic note of δεινότης (terrible earnestness) is heard, but it leaves an unpleasant impression. In the pathetic passages we remember the trivial occasion of the action, nor can the victim's indignation hide the fact that he accepted a compromise".

Towards the end of the speech, Demosthenes created a highly unpleasant portrayal of Meidias and his rich associates. These people were viewed as detrimental to the future of the Athens, specifically its institutions and the officials involved in them. In light of these events, Demosthenes draws the judges' attention to Meidias's active involvement in civic affairs but engages in a distinct modus operandi, or habits of working. According to Ana Lucia Curado, "Unlike Demosthenes, Meidias prepared himself to sow 'seeds' in Athenian public life, not only through his immediate supporters but also through his children, who would follow in his footsteps of the parent who had taught them a total disregard for the law."
