= E. D. A. Morshead =

English classicist and teacher (1849–1912)

Edmund Doidge Anderson Morshead (1849 – 24 October 1912) was an English classicist and teacher.

== Biography ==
He was the son of John Philip Anderson Morshead, educated at Winchester College and New College, Oxford; and later returned to teach classics at Winchester in the 1870s, 80s and 90s. There, he gained the nickname "Mush" (his classroom hence inevitably becoming the "Mushroom"). Morshead was famed for his personal idiolect, eccentric even by the standards of Victorian schoolmasters, known as "Mushri". His pupils compiled and privately published a "Mushri-English pronouncing dictionary", which proved popular enough to run to seven editions. It now forms a valuable source for research into upper-class slang in Victorian England.

Morshead has been described by the academic Christopher Stray as a "Liberal among Tories", an eccentric and an individualist. Notably for a classicist in the late 19th century, he spoke out against the view, held by some of his colleagues, of science as "the enemy", and considered some defences of his discipline as bigoted, ill-informed assaults upon it. Stray emphasises his contribution to personal idiosyncrasy in the increasingly homogenous age of the Industrial Revolution, and draws parallels between Morshead's teaching and that of teachers in the Greek and Roman era.

== Translations ==
Morshead is chiefly known for his translations into English of the plays of Aeschylus, written in metred verse. His language is often archaic and makes great use of eye rhymes and similar devices.

- The House of Atreus (The Oresteia)
- The Suppliant Maidens
- The Persians
- Seven Against Thebes
- Prometheus Bound

== Other works ==
Morshead reviewed William Morris's translation of the Odyssey in "Academy" (vol. XXXI, p. 299), published on 30 April 1887. New College, Oxford also holds in its archives an essay written by Morshead on 19 March 1886 for its Essay Society, on the Society's history.
