= Genus (linguistics) =

In linguistics, a genus is a group of phylogenetically related languages inside a linguistic family, in particular a genus is a group of languages which can be recognized as related languages without using complex methods of historical linguistics. The notion of genus was proposed by M. Dryer, and is used commonly in some academic projects such as WALS. According to WALS most families can be subdivided into a certain number of genera, so the notion is similar to the term subfamily.

== Introduction ==
=== Language families ===
Since the 18th century, linguists have classified languages according to phylogenetic criteria. Before the 18th century, the common origins of Germanic languages or Slavic languages had been recognized. Many authors hypothesized that each of these language groups derived from a common "mother language" (in a similar way in which Romance languages derive historically from Latin). The philologists of the 19th century called a group of related languages a "family of sister languages" (generalizing the genealogical metaphor). When a "mother language" is undocumented, but can be partially reconstructed from its "daughter languages", one refers to this language as a proto-language.

With the development of comparative linguistics and the establishment of historical linguistics as a scientific discipline, more "language families" were recognized, and more proto-languages were proposed.

=== Lack of comparability ===
There are some problems when one tries to compare language families. Some families are huge, and their proto-languages were spoken several millennia ago, but other families are tiny and their ancestor languages seem to have been spoken more recently. Indeed, the establishment of an accepted language family depends on the quality of the documentation and the amount of comparative work done in each group of languages. Obviously, the languages of Europe were well known in the 19th century, and the Indo-European language family was well-established early on. As to the remainder of the world languages, in the 19th century only a few language families were identified, often in an incomplete manner (the Bantu and Malayo-Polynesian languages were recognized as groups of related languages, but not the Niger–Congo or Austronesian languages).

=== Genera ===
On the other hand, all the genera are internally much more homogeneous than language families. In addition, most language genera seem to involve more or less the same time depth. For these reason, genera are much more suitable for typological comparison than language families.

== Bibliography ==
- Dryer, Matthew S. 1989. "Large linguistic areas and language sampling". Studies in Language 13, pp. 257–292.
