= Gens (anthropology) =

Gens was used by Lewis H. Morgan (in Ancient Society) and Friedrich Engels (in The Origin of the Family, Private Property and the State), among others, to refer to a group of people who were related through their female ancestor, in a gens organized according to mother-right, or through their male ancestor, in a gens organized according to father-right. It is also used by other anthropology writers to refer exclusively to groups of people who are related through their male ancestor.
