= Ian C. Johnston =

Canadian translator and instructor (born 1938)

Professor Ian Johnston
- Born: Ian C. Johnston; Valparaíso, Chile
- Education: McGill University; University of Bristol; University of Toronto
- Occupations: Professor (retired), author, translator
- Spouse: Colleen Johnston
- Writing career
- Language: English
- Genre: Languages

Ian C. Johnston (born September 27, 1938) is a Canadian author and translator, a retired university-college instructor and a professor emeritus at Vancouver Island University.

== Early life and education ==
Johnston was born in Valparaíso, Chile, to Dorothy and Kenneth Johnston. He attended the University of Toronto Schools during his high school years. At the post-secondary level, he was educated at McGill University, Montreal (BSC in Geology and Chemistry 1959); at the University of Bristol (BA in English and Greek, 1968); and at the University of Toronto (MA in English, 1969).

He holds certificates from Ontario College of Education, Heidelberg University, and the Jarvis School of Welding.

== Teaching career ==
Johnston taught high-school physics and chemistry at Upper Canada College, Toronto (1959–60) and high-school biology, mathematics, and Latin at Port Perry High School, Port Perry, Ontario (1961-1963). From 1969-70 he taught undergraduate English courses at the University of British Columbia. After that he joined the faculty of the College of New Caledonia, Prince George, British Columbia, where he taught undergraduate English and Classics from 1970 to 1975. From 1975-2004 he taught at Malaspina College and Malaspina University-College, Nanaimo (now Vancouver Island University).

== Publications and other work ==
Johnston is the author of The Ironies of War: An Introduction to Homer's Iliad (University Press of America, 1987). He has translated classic works from Greek, Latin, German, and French. Several of these translated works have been published by Broadview Press, including his translation of Franz Kafka's The Metamorphosis, and/or produced as audiobooks by Naxos Audio Books in the UK.

A number of his translations have also been issued in book form by Richer Resources Publications. Johnston has posted over 75 essays and lectures on various literary topics on his website, as well as workbooks on essay writing, grammar, statistics, and the history of science.

Johnston has also written Essays and Arguments: A Handbook for Writing Student Essays, released by Broadview Press in 2015.

== Translations by Ian Johnston ==
- Aeschylus, Oresteia
- Aeschylus, Persians
- Aeschylus, Prometheus Bound
- Aeschylus, Seven Against Thebes
- Aeschylus, Suppliant Women
- Aristophanes, Birds
- Aristophanes, Clouds
- Aristophanes, Frogs
- Aristophanes, Knights
- Aristophanes, Lysistrata
- Aristophanes, Peace
- Aristotle, Nicomachean Ethics (Abridged)
- Cuvier, On the Revolutionary Upheavals on the Surface of the Earth
- Diderot, D’Alembert's Dream
- Diderot, Rameau's Nephew
- Descartes, Discourse on Method
- Descartes, Meditations on First Philosophy
- Euripides, Bacchae
- Euripides, Electra
- Euripides, Medea
- Euripides, Orestes
- Homer, Iliad (complete and abridged)
- Homer, Odyssey (complete and abridged)
- Homer, The Odyssey: Selections (Broadview Edition 2019)
- Kafka, Metamorphosis, Hunger Artist, In the Penal Colony, and Other Stories
- Kafka, The Metamorphosis and Other Stories (Broadview Edition 2015)
- Kant, On Perpetual Peace
- Kant, Universal Natural History and Theory of the Heavens
- Lamarck, Zoological Philosophy, Volume I
- Lucretius, The Nature of Things
- Nietzsche, Beyond Good and Evil
- Nietzsche, Birth of Tragedy
- Nietzsche, Genealogy of Morals
- Nietzsche, On the Use and Abuse of History for Life
- Ovid, Metamorphoses
- Rousseau, On the Sciences and the Arts
- Rousseau, On the Origin of Inequality
- Rousseau, On the Social Contract
- Sophocles, Ajax
- Sophocles, Antigone
- Sophocles, Oedipus at Colonus
- Sophocles, Oedipus the King
- Sophocles, Philoctetes
- Wedekind, Castle Wetterstein (Broadview Edition 2019)

== Personal life ==
Johnston lives in Nanaimo, British Columbia, Canada, with his wife, Colleen Johnston.
