= Gens (disambiguation) =

A gens was a family in Ancient Rome in which all of the members typically bore the same nomen and claimed descent from a common ancestor.

Gens can also refer to:

== People ==
- Jacob Gens (1903-1943), Jewish head of the Vilnius Ghetto
- Saint Gens (1104–1127), French hermit
- Véronique Gens (born 1966), French soprano singer
- Xavier Gens (born 1975), French film director

== Other uses ==
- Gens (anthropology), a group of people related through their female or male ancestor
- Gens (band), Italian pop band
- Gens (behaviour), a specific lineage of animals sharing a specific behavioral trait, inherited from a common ancestor
- Gens (emulator), an emulator of the Sega Mega Drive / Genesis video game console
