= Luciano Federici =

Italian footballer (1938–2020)

Personal information
- Date of birth: 16 May 1938
- Place of birth: Carrara, Tuscany, Italy
- Date of death: 18 March 2020 (aged 81)
- Place of death: Carrara, Tuscany, Italy
- Height: 1.73 m (5 ft 8 in)
- Position: Defender

Youth career
- 195?–1955: Carrarese

Senior career*
Years	Team	Apps	(Gls)
1955–1958	Carrarese	18	(0)
1958–1963	Cosenza	69	(2)
1963–1969	Pisa	129	(0)
- * Club domestic league appearances and goals

Luciano Federici (Italian pronunciation: [luˈtʃaːno fedeˈriːtʃi]; 16 May 1938 – 18 March 2020) was an Italian professional footballer. He played in all three of Italy's top professional leagues, including for Carrarese, Cosenza and Pisa.

On 18 March 2020, Federici died from COVID-19, amid its pandemic in Italy.
