= The Origin of the Family, Private Property and the State =

1884 book by Friedrich Engels

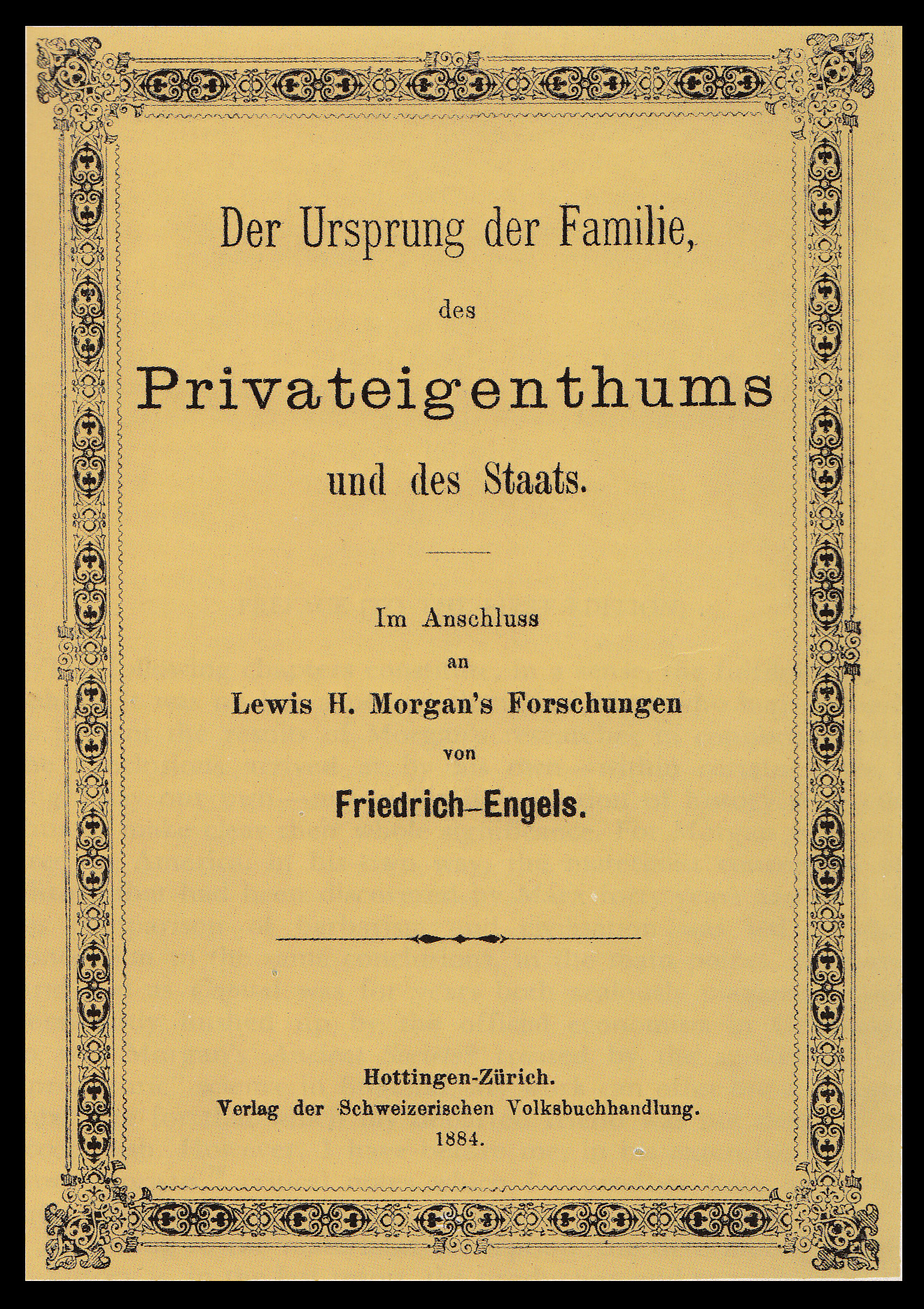
- First edition (1884)
- Author: Friedrich Engels
- Original title: Der Ursprung der Familie, des Privateigenthums und des Staats
- Language: German
- Subjects: Capitalism, Gender roles, Nuclear family, Patriarchy
- Publication date: 1884
- English publication date: 1902
- Text: The Origin of the Family, Private Property and the State at Wikisource

The Origin of the Family, Private Property and the State: in the Light of the Researches of Lewis H. Morgan (German: Der Ursprung der Familie, des Privateigenthums und des Staats) is an 1884 anthropological treatise by Friedrich Engels. It is partially based on notes by Karl Marx to Lewis H. Morgan's book Ancient Society (1877). The book is an early historical materialist work and is regarded as one of the first major works on family economics.

== Summary ==
=== Ancient Society ===
The Origin of the Family, Private Property and the State begins with an extensive discussion of Morgan's Ancient Society, which aims to describe the major stages of human development, and agrees with the work that the first domestic institution in human history was the matrilineal clan. Morgan was a pioneering American anthropologist and business lawyer who championed the land rights of Native Americans. Traditionally, the Iroquois had lived in communal longhouses based on matrilineal descent and matrilocal residence, giving women a great deal of power. Engels stressed the theoretical significance of Morgan's highlighting of the matrilineal clan:

The rediscovery of the original mother-right gens as the stage preliminary to the father-right gens of the civilized peoples has the same significance for the history of primitive society as Darwin’s theory of evolution has for biology, and Marx’s theory of surplus value for political economy.

— Engels, Friedrich (1884). "Preface to the Fourth Edition". The Origin of the Family, Private Property and the State. New York: Pathfinder Press. pp. 27–38, the quotation is on p.36.

Primitive communism, according to both Morgan and Engels, was based in the matrilineal clan where females lived with their classificatory sisters – applying the principle that "my sister’s child is my child". Because they lived and worked together, females in these communal households felt strong bonds of solidarity with one another, enabling them when necessary to take action against uncooperative men. Engels cites this passage from a letter to Morgan written by a missionary who had lived for many years among the Seneca Iroquois,

As to their family system, when occupying the old long-houses, it is probable that some one clan predominated, the women taking in husbands, however, from the other clans; and sometimes, for a novelty, some of their sons bringing in their young wives until they felt brave enough to leave their mothers. Usually, the female portion ruled the house, and were doubtless clannish enough about it. The stores were held in common; but woe to the luckless husband or lover who was too shiftless to do his share of the providing. No matter how many children, or whatever goods he might have in the house, he might at any time be ordered to pack up his blanket and budge; and after such orders it would not be healthful for him to attempt to disobey. The house would be too hot for him; and, unless saved by the intercession of some aunt or grandmother, he must retreat to his own clan; or, as was often done, go and start a new matrimonial alliance in some other. The women were the great power among the clans, as everywhere else. They did not hesitate, when occasion required, to "knock off the horns", as it was technically called, from the head of a chief, and send him back to the ranks of the warriors. The original nomination of the chiefs also always rested with them.

— Morgan, Lewis H. (1877). Ancient Society. London: Macmillan. p. 455.

According to Morgan, the rise of alienable property disempowered women by triggering a switch to patrilocal residence and patrilineal descent:

It thus reversed the position of the wife and mother in the household; she was of a different gens from her children, as well as her husband; and under monogamy was now isolated from her gentile kindred, living in the separate and exclusive house of her husband. Her new condition tended to subvert and destroy that power and influence which descent in the female line and the joint-tenement houses had created.

— Morgan, Lewis H. (1881). Houses and house-life of the American Aborigines. Chicago and London: University of Chicago Press. p. 128.

=== Development of human society and the family ===
Engels added political impact to Morgan's studies of women in prehistory, describing the "overthrow of mother right" as "the world-historic defeat of the female sex"; he attributed this defeat to the onset of farming and pastoralism. In reaction, most twentieth-century social anthropologists considered the theory of matrilineal priority untenable, though feminist scholars of the 1970s-1980s (particularly socialist and radical feminists) attempted to revive it with limited success. In recent years, some proponents have attempted to rehabilitate this view using the rare indications of matrilocal marriage in ancient remains as evidence. However, the vast majority of ancient remains show patrilocality and female out-marriage. This is true even of Neanderthal populations.

Engels emphasizes the importance of social relations of power and control over material resources rather than supposed psychological deficiencies of "primitive" people. In the eyes of both Morgan and Engels, terms such as "savagery" and "barbarism" were respectful and honorific, not negative. Engels summarises Morgan's three main stages as follows:

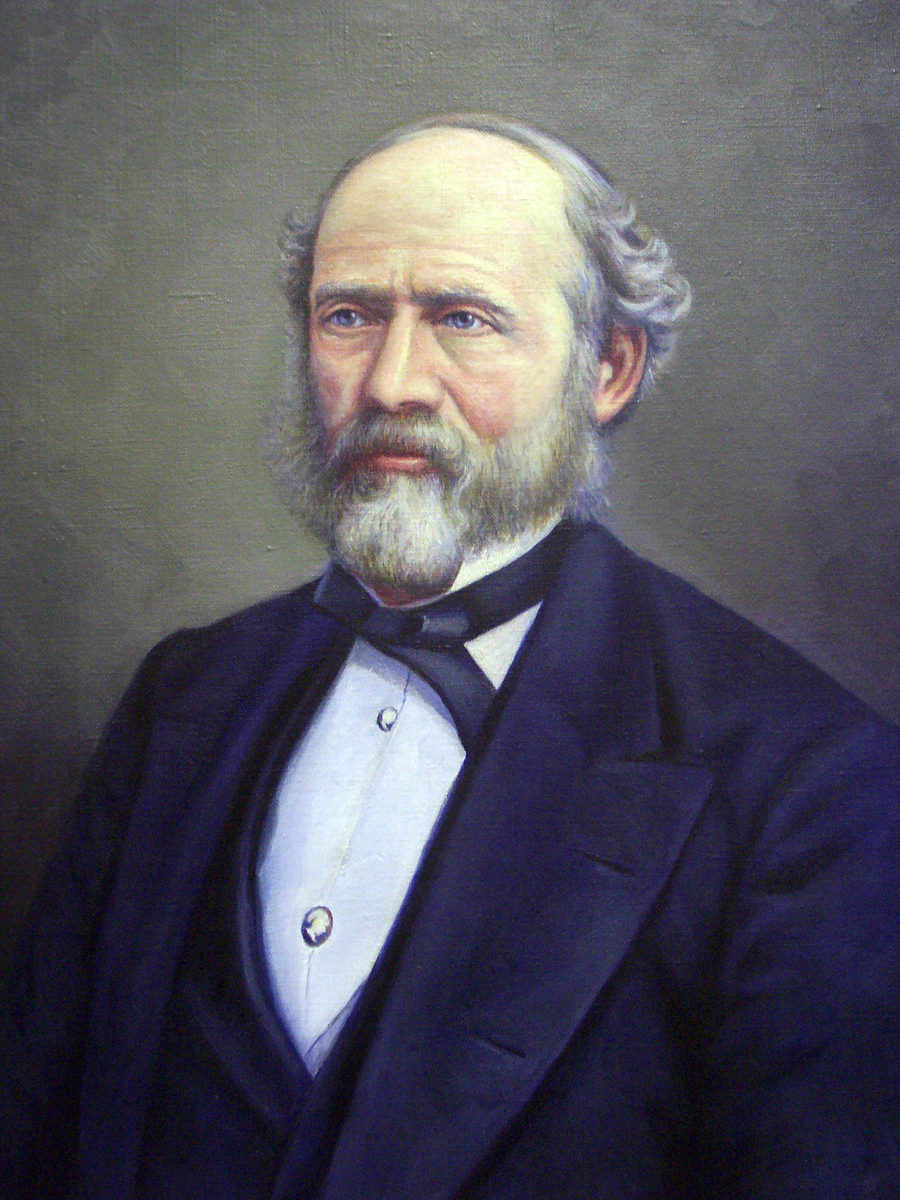
Lewis Henry Morgan (1818–1881), whose pioneering anthropological study of Native American peoples was adapted by Frederick Engels in The Origin of the Family.

1. Savagery – the period in which man's appropriation of products in their natural state predominates; the products of human art are chiefly instruments which assist this appropriation.
2. Barbarism – the period during which man learns to breed domestic animals and to practice agriculture, and acquires methods of increasing the supply of natural products by human activity.
3. Civilization – the period in which man learns a more advanced application of work to the products of nature, the period of industry proper and of art.

In the following chapter on family, Engels seeks to connect the transition into these stages with a change in the way that family is defined and the rules by which it is governed. Much of this is still taken from Morgan, although Engels begins to intersperse his own ideas on the role of family into the text. Morgan acknowledges four stages in the family.

The consanguine family is the first stage of the family and as such a primary indicator of our superior nature in comparison with animals. In this state marriage groups are separated according to generations. The husband and wife relationship is immediately and communally assumed between the male and female members of one generation. The only taboo is a sexual relationship between two generations (i.e. father and daughter, grandmother and grandson).

The punaluan family, the second stage, extends the incest taboo to include sexual intercourse between siblings, including all cousins of the same generation. This prevents most incestuous relationships. The separation of the patriarchal and matriarchal lines divided a family into gentes. Interbreeding was forbidden within gens (anthropology), although first cousins from separate gentes could still breed.

In the pairing family, the first indications of pairing are found in families where the husband has one primary wife. Inbreeding is practically eradicated by the prevention of a marriage between two family members who were even just remotely related, while relationships also start to approach monogamy. Property and economics begin to play a larger part in the family, as a pairing family had responsibility for the ownership of specific goods and property. Polygamy is still common amongst men, but no longer amongst women since their fidelity would ensure the child's legitimacy. Women have a superior role in the family as keepers of the household and guardians of legitimacy. The pairing family is the form characteristic of the lower stages of barbarism. However, at this point, when the man died his inheritance was still given to his gens, rather than to his offspring. Engels refers to this economic advantage for men coupled with the woman's lack of rights to lay claim to possessions for herself or her children (who became hers after a separation) as the overthrow of mother-right which was "the world historical defeat of the female sex". For Engels, ownership of property created the first significant division between men and women in which the woman was inferior.

On the monogamous family, Engels writes:

It develops from the pairing family, as we have already shown, during the time of transition from the middle to the higher stage of barbarism. Its final victory is one of the signs of beginning civilization. It is founded on male supremacy for the pronounced purpose of breeding children of indisputable paternal lineage. The latter is required, because these children shall later on inherit the fortune of their father. The monogamous family is distinguished from the pairing family by the far greater durability of wedlock, which can no longer be dissolved at the pleasure of either party. As a rule, it is only the man who can still dissolve it and cast off his wife.

— Engels, Friedrich (1884). "Preface to the Fourth Edition". The Origin of the Family, Private Property and the State. New York: Pathfinder Press. p. 75.

=== Family and property ===
Engels' ideas on the role of property in the creation of the modern family and as such modern civilization begin to become more transparent in the latter part of Chapter 2 as he begins to elaborate on the question of the monogamous relationship and the freedom to enter into (or refuse) such a relationship. Bourgeois law dictates the rules for relationships and inheritances. As such, two partners, even when their marriage is not arranged, will always have the preservation of inheritance in mind and as such will never be entirely free to choose their partner. Engels argues that a relationship based on property rights and forced monogamy will only lead to the proliferation of sexual immorality and prostitution.

The only class, according to Engels, which is free from these restraints of property, and as a result from the danger of moral decay, is the proletariat, as they lack the monetary means that are the basis of (as well as threat to) the bourgeois marriage. Monogamy is therefore guaranteed by the fact that theirs is a voluntary sex-love relationship.

The social revolution which Engels believed was about to happen would eliminate class differences, and therefore also the need for prostitution and the enslavement of women. If men needed only to be concerned with sex-love and no longer with property and inheritance, then monogamy would come naturally.

== Publication history ==
Cover of the 1st English-language edition, published by Charles H. Kerr & Co. of Chicago in 1902.

=== Background ===
Following the death of his friend and co-thinker Karl Marx in 1883, Engels served as his literary executor, organizing his various writings and preparing them for publication. While time-consuming, this activity did not fully occupy Engels's available hours, and he continued to read and write on topics of his own.

While Engels' 1883 manuscript Dialectics of Nature was left uncompleted and unpublished, he successfully published Der Ursprung der Familie, des Privateigenthums und des Staats: Im Anschluss an Lewis H. Morgan's Forschungen (The Origin of the Family, Private Property, and the State: in the Light of the Researches of Lewis H. Morgan) in Zürich in the spring of 1884.

The writing of The Origin of the Family began in early April 1884, and was completed on 26 May. Engels began work on the treatise after reading Marx's handwritten synopsis of Lewis H. Morgan's Ancient Society; or, Researches in the Lines of Human Progress from Savagery, Through Barbarism to Civilization, first published in London in 1877. Engels believed that Marx had intended to create a critical book-length treatment of the ideas suggested by Morgan, and aimed to produce such a manuscript to fulfill his late comrade's wishes.

Engels acknowledged these motives, noting in the preface to the first edition that "Marx had reserved to himself the privilege of displaying the results of Morgan's investigations in connection with his own materialist conception of history", as the latter had "in a manner discovered anew" in America the theory originated by Marx decades before.

=== Writing process ===
Engels's first inclination was to seek publication in Germany in spite of the passage of the first of the Anti-Socialist Laws by the government of Chancellor Otto von Bismarck. On April 26, 1884, Engels wrote a letter to his close political associate Karl Kautsky, saying he sought to "play a trick on Bismarck" by writing something "that he would be positively unable to ban". He felt this goal unrealizable owing to Morgan's discussions of the nature of monogamy and the relationship between private ownership of property and class struggle, however, these making it "absolutely impossible to couch in such a way as to comply with the Anti-Socialist Law".

Engels viewed Morgan's findings as providing a "factual basis we have hitherto lacked" for a prehistory of contemporary class struggle. He believed that it would be an important supplement to the theory of historical materialism for Morgan's ideas to be "thoroughly worked on, properly weighed up, and presented as a coherent whole". This was to be the political intent behind his Origin of the Family project.

Work on the book was completed—with the exception of revisions to the final chapter—on May 22, 1884, when the manuscript was dispatched to Eduard Bernstein in Zürich. The final decision of whether to print the book in Stuttgart "under a false style", hiding Engels's forbidden name, or immediately without alteration in a Swiss edition, was deferred by Engels to Bernstein. The latter course of action was chosen, with the book finding print early in October.

=== Editions ===
The first edition of Der Ursprung der Familie appeared in Zürich in October 1884, with the possibility of German publication forestalled by Bismarck's Anti-Socialist Law. Two subsequent German editions, each following the first Zürich edition exactly, were published in Stuttgart in 1886 and 1889.

The book was translated into a number of European languages and published during the decade of the 1880s, including Polish, Romanian, Italian, Danish, and Serbian.

Changes to the text were made by Engels for a fourth German language edition, published in 1891, with an effort made to incorporate contemporary findings in the fields of anthropology and ethnography into the work.

The first English language edition did not appear until 1902, when Charles H. Kerr commissioned Ernest Untermann to produce a translation for the "Standard Socialist Series" of popularly priced pocket editions produced by his Charles H. Kerr & Co. of Chicago. The work was extensively reprinted throughout the 20th and into the 21st Centuries and is regarded as one of Engels' seminal works.
