= Rush Rehm =

American academic (born 1949)

Maurice Pate (Rush) Rehm
- Born: 1949 (age 76–77); United States
- Occupations: Professor, actor

Academic background
- Education: Princeton University

Academic work
- Discipline: Drama, classics
- Institutions: Stanford University

Rush Rehm is professor of drama and classics at Stanford University in California, in the United States. He also works professionally as an actor and director. He has published many works on classical theatre. Rehm is the artistic director of Stanford Repertory Theater (SRT), a professional theater company that presents a dramatic festival based on a major playwright each summer. SRT's 2016 summer festival, Theater Takes a Stand, celebrates the struggle for workers' rights. In 2014, he was awarded Stanford's Lloyd W. Dinkelspiel Award for Outstanding Service to Undergraduate Education.

== Life ==
Rehm received his BA in creative writing and classics from Princeton University, where he graduated summa cum laude in 1973. In 1975 he received his MA in classical studies from Melbourne University as a Fulbright fellow and a Sachs scholarship. He completed his PhD in drama (directing and criticism) and humanities from Stanford University in 1985.

From 1985 to 1990, Rehm was an assistant professor of classics and theater studies at Emory University, where he taught acting and directing in addition to Greek and classical drama. He moved to Stanford in 1990, promoted to professor of drama and classics since 2003, and retired in 2024.

Founder and Artistic Director of Stanford Repertory Theater (SRT), he has acted in, directed, and produced dozen of plays, including SRT's Clytemnestra: Tangled Justice (his adaption of Aeschylus' Oresteia), Words (and Images) to End All Wars (his compilation of artistic responses to World War I), and Orson Welles' The War of the Worlds and Moby Dick - Rehearsed, which received the Theater Bay Area 2014 award for Outstanding Direction, Ensemble, and Production. In October 2025, he will direct a staged reading of Judgements: 18th Century Slave Trials in Cape Town.

== Works ==
=== Books ===
- Euripides: Electra, Bloomsbury Companions to Greek and Roman Tragedy (London: Bloomsbury, 2020, revised paperback 2022)
- Understanding Greek Tragic Theatre (2nd rev ed., Greek Tragic Theatre, London: Routledge, 2016)
- Radical Theatre: Greek Tragedy and the Modern World, London: Duckworth, 2003, ISBN 0-7156-2916-6
- The Play of Space: Spatial Transformation in Greek Tragedy, Princeton University Press, 2002, ISBN 9781400825073
- Marriage to Death: The Conflation of Wedding and Funeral Rituals in Greek Tragedy, Princeton University Press, 1994, ISBN 9780691029160
- Greek Tragic Theatre, Routledge, 1992, ISBN 978-0415118941
- A new addition, Understanding Greek Tragic Theatre, will be published in June 2016.
- Aeschylus' Oresteia: A Theatre Version, Melbourne: Hawthorne Press, 1978.

=== Articles and reviews, contributions to edited volumes ===
- 1980. “On Time and Timing: Waiting for Godot and the Theatre,” Viewpoints, ed. B. McFarlane, Melbourne (1980) 66– 81
- 1981. From Performance: Iliad” (translation), Scripsi, (Spring 1981) 108–12
- “1985. Aeschylus and Performance,” Themes in Drama, ed. J. Redmond, CUP (1985) 229–48
- 1988. “The Staging of Suppliant Plays,” Greek, Roman, and Byzantine Studies 29 (1988) 263–307
- 1989. Aeschylus: The Commerce of Tragedy and Politics,” in Syracuse, The Fairest Greek City, ed. B.D. Wescoat (Rome 1989) 31–34
- 1989. "Medea and the Logos of the Heroic." Eranos 87: 97-115.
- 1995. “Theatre de Complicité: An Appreciation,” TheatreForum 6 (1995) 88–96
- 1996. “Choral Presence, Absence, and Interaction in Euripides,” Arion (Spring 1996) 45–60
- 1996. “Public Spaces, Private Voices: Sophocles’ Electra and Euripides’ Suppliant Women,” Drama 4 (Stuttgart 1996) 49–61
- 2000. “Before, Behind, Beyond: Tragic Space in Euripides’ Heracles,” in Euripides, edd M. Cropp, K. Lee, and D. Sansone (Chicago 2000) 363–75
- 2002. “Supplices, the Satyr Play – Mee’s Big Love,” American Journal of Philology 123 (2002) 111–18
- 2004. Introduction. In Oedipus Coloneus by Sophocles. Ed. P. E. Easterling. Trans. Richard Claverhouse Jebb. London: British Classical Press. ISBN 978-1-85399-646-7.
- 2005. Review in Translation and Literature 14.1: 86. Weblink
- 2005. "Female Solidarity: Timely Resistance in Greek Tragedy," in Rebel Women, ed. S. Wilmer. London: Methuen, 177–92.
- 2006. "Antigone and Family Values," Antigone's Answer: Essays on Death and Burial, Family and State in Classical Athens, ed. C.B. Patterson. Helios Supplement, 187–218.
- 2006. "Sophocles on Fire - To Pyr in Philoctetes," in Sophocles and the Greek Language: Aspects of Diction, Syntax, and the Greek Language, eds. I.J.F. de Jong and A. Rijksbaron. Leiden: Brill, 95-107.
- 2006. "Cassandra - The Prophetess Unveiled," in Agamemnon in Performance, eds. E. Hall and F. McIntosh. Oxford: Oxford University Press, 343–58.
- 2007. "Festivals and Audiences in Athens and Rome," in Cambridge Companion to Greek and Roman Theatre, ed. M. Walton and M. McDonald, 184–218.
- 2007, paperback 2010. "If you are a woman": Theatrical Womanizing in Sophocles' Antigone and Fugard, Kani, and Ntshona's The Island," in Classics in Post-Colonial Worlds, eds. C. Gillispie and L. Hardwick. Cambridge: Cambridge University Press, 2007/2010, 211-27.
- 2008. "The Future of Dramatic Literature," in Text and Presentations 28, ed. S. Constantinidis, 216–218.
- 2009. Review in Classical World 102, 501–2, on How to Stage Greek Tragedy Today by S. Goldhill.
- 2009. Review in Sophocles and the Greek Tragic Tradition, eds. S. Goldhill and E. Hall, in Ancient History Bulletin 23, 108–12.
- 2009. "Tragedy and Privilege," in The Play of Texts and Fragments: Essays in Honour of Martin Cropp, eds. J.R.C. Cousland and J.R. Hume, Mnemosyne, Supplement 314. Leiden and Boston: Brill, 235–53.
- 2009. Review in Sophocles and Alcibiades: Athenian Politics in Ancient Greek Literature by M. Vickers, in Comparative Drama, 402–5.
- 2010. Review in Performance and Culture by K.V. Hartigan, Text & Presentation, 2010. Comparative Drama Conference, 166–8.
- 2012. "Aeschylus" and "Sophocles," in Space in Ancient Greek Literature: Studies in Ancient Greek Narrative, Mnemosyne Supplement, Vol. 339, ed. I.J.F. de Jong. Leiden and Boston: Brill, 307-23 and 325–39.
- 2012. "Ritual in Sophocles," in Brill Companion to Sophocles, ed. A. Markantonatos. Leiden and Boston: Brill, 411–28.
- 2013. Review in Antigone, translated by David Mulroy, Digresses.
- 2015. "Eclectic Encounters: Staging Greek Tragedy in America, 1973-2009," in The Oxford Handbook of Greek Drama in the Americas, eds. K. Bosher, F. Macintosh, J. McConnell, and P. Rankine. Oxford: Oxford University Press, 758–75.
- 2015. Review in Space, Place, and Landscape in Ancient Greek Literature and Culture, eds. K. Gilhuly and N. Worman, in Classical Philology.
- 2016. “Beckett on Aging: A Short Introduction,” in Samuel Beckett Today/Aujourd’hui 28 (2016) 161–7
- 2017. “Aeschylus in the Balance: Weighing Corpses and the Problem of Translation,” in Aeschylus’ Tragedies: The Cultural Divide and the Trauma of Adaptation, edd. S.E. Constantinidis and B. Heiden (Brill 2017) 131–46
- 2018. “Antigone and the Rights of the Earth," in Looking at Antigone, ed. D. Stuttard (Bloomsbury 2018) 93–106
- 2020. “Ritual in Euripides,” in Brill Companion to Euripides, ed. A. Markantonatos (Leiden and Boston, 2020) 821–40
- 2021. There is the sea – who can drain it dry?’: Natural and Unnatural Cycles in Agamemnon,” in Looking at Agamemnon, ed. D. Stuttard (Bloomsbury 2021) 119–34
- 2021. “Disorienting Aeschylus’s Persians” in Dramaturgias 17 (October 2021) Aeschylus, ed. M.Mota (Laboratório de Dramaturgia (LADI) da Universidade de Brasilias) 111–25 https://periodicos.unb.br/index.php/dramaturgias/issue/archive
- 2022. “Land, Sea and Freedom: Nature in Aeschylus’ Persians,” in Looking at Persians, ed. D. Stuttard (Bloomsbury: London, 2022) 99–114
- 2022. “Mimo wszystko nie ustepowaly: Medea, Hekabe i Helena Eurypidesa,” in Eurypides Innowator, eds. K. Bielawskiego i W. Staniewskiego (Osrodek Praktyk Teatralnych „Gardzienice” Warszawa 2022) 283–93
- 2022. “Did Horses Perform in the Athenian Theater?” in Hippos, ed. J. Neils (American School of Classical Studies, Athens: 2022) 252–55
- 2024. “Fated Arrivals: Greek Tragedy and Migration,” in Theatre and Migration, eds. Y. Meerzon and S. Wilmer (Palgrave Macmillan; London, 2024) 195–206
- 2024. “Telling Stories, Moving Audiences: The Structure of Greek Tragedy,” in Looking at Greek Tragedy, ed. D. Stuttard (Bloomsbury: London, forthcoming 2024)
- 2025. “Sun, Sea, and Fish: Parthenon East Metope 14 and Greek Tragedy,” in Athenian Technē: Objects, Images, and Monuments in Context, eds. D.K. Rogers, T.J. Smith, and A.R. Steiner (Brill: Leiden: forthcoming 2025)
- 2025. “Caught in the Reins: Horses and Hippolytus,” in Looking at Hippolytus, ed. D. Stuttard (Bloomsbury: London, forthcoming 2025)

== See also ==
- Theatre of ancient Greece
- Stanford University School of Humanities and Sciences
