= Maria Federici =

Italian politician (1899–1984)

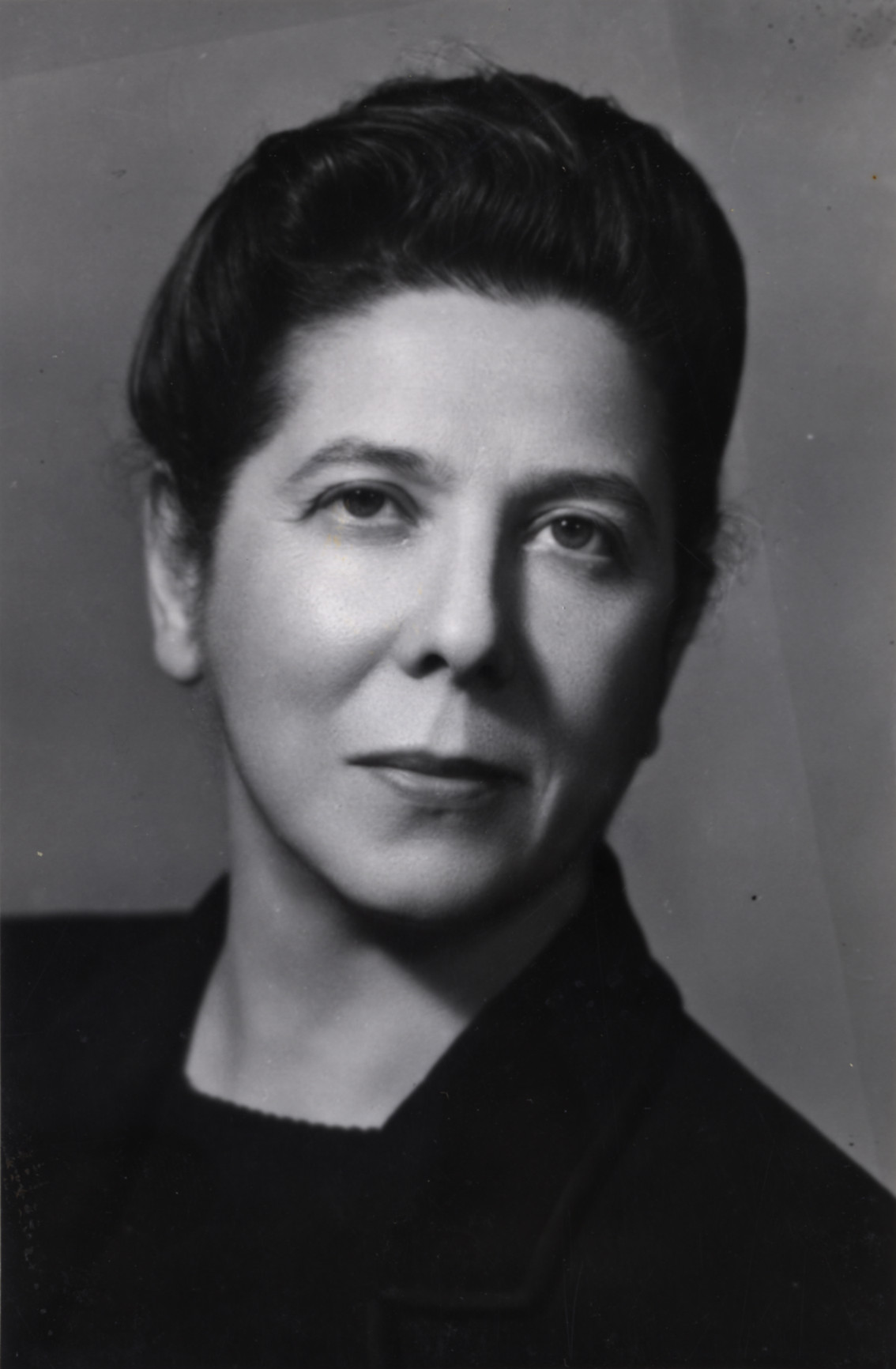
- Official portrait, 1948

Member of the Chamber of Deputies
- In office 1948–1953
- Constituency: Perugia

Member of the Constituent Assembly
- In office 1946–1948

Personal details
- Born: Anna Maria Agamben; 19 September 1899 L'Aquila, Kingdom of Italy
- Died: 28 July 1984 (aged 84) Rome, Italy
- Party: Christian Democracy (DC)
- Spouse: Mario Federici (m. 1926; died 1975)
- Education: Sapienza University of Rome
- Occupation: Politician

Anna Maria Federici Agamben (née Agamben; 19 September 1899 – 28 July 1984) was an Italian politician. She was elected to the Constituent Assembly in 1946 as one of the first group of women parliamentarians in Italy. In 1948 she was elected to the Chamber of Deputies, which she remained a member of until 1953.

== Biography ==
Anna Maria Agamben was born in L'Aquila in 1899, the oldest of six children in a well-off family of Armenian descent. She studied literature at the Sapienza University of Rome, after which she became a history and Italian teacher. She married the playwright Mario Federici in 1926. Unhappy with the Mussolini government, they moved to Bulgaria in 1929, later relocating to Egypt and then Paris. She returned to Italy in 1939 and was part of the Italian resistance movement during World War II. In 1944 she was one of the founders of the Italian Women's Centre, of which she was president until 1950.

Following the war, she was a Christian Democracy candidate in the 1946 elections and was one of 21 women elected to the Constituent Assembly. The following year she founded the National Association of Emigrant Families, which she remained president of until 1981. She was subsequently elected to the Chamber of Deputies from Perugia in the 1948 elections and sat on the Labor and Social Security. After retiring from politics in 1953, she focussed on women's and emigrants' issues.

She died in Rome in 1984.
