= Nora Federici =

Italian statistician (1910–2001)

- Born: 27 April 1910; Rome
- Died: 9 September 2001 (aged 91); Grottaferrata, Rome
- Occupations: Statistician, professor

Academic background
- Education: University of Rome

Academic work
- Notable students: Antonio Golini, Graziella Caselli, Eugenio Sonnino, Viviana Egidi, Giuseppe Gesano
- Main interests: Population studies, demography, anthropology

Federici Nora (27 April 1910 in Rome – 9 September 2001 in Grottaferrata, Rome) was an Italian statistician.

== Biography ==
Federici obtained a degree in political science at the University of Rome in 1933. In 1934 she took part in Corrado Gini's expedition to study the anthropometrics of Polish minorities such as the Karaites. She subscribed to Fascism and was antisemitic, and was responsible for furnishing as a demographer detailed proposals for ‘reducing the number of Jewish individuals resident in Italy and, specifically isolating them spiritually and socially from the life of the nation,’ a measure she openly admired in Nazism.

Her area of specialization was demography, over which she ranged widely with particular regard to the intersections between biological and social demography. She founded the journal Genus, which she directed from 1966 to 1994. She strongly supported the demographic studies in Italy, after the crisis followed to racial laws in the years of Second World War. During her long teaching career, she obtained (1961) the first chair of demography at an Italian University. Nora Federici's interests extended beyond the world of universities, and she played a role in making demography a topic of public interest.

== Research interests ==
Population studies, Demography and Anthropology.

== Education ==
Degree in Political Sciences (1933) at the University of Rome with a dissertation in Statistics.

== Academic positions ==
Professor of Demografia at the University of Rome, she taught also at the Universities of Perugia and Palermo. She was Director of the institute (Department) of Demography (1957–1979).

== Honours and awards ==
Honoris causa by International Union for the Scientific Study of Population. She was a member of the Accademia dei Lincei.

== Known for ==
Population studies, Gender studies.

== Students ==
Antonio Golini, Graziella Caselli, Eugenio Sonnino, Viviana Egidi, Giuseppe Gesano.

== Publications ==
- Mortalità, mortalità infantile e mortalità antenatale nelle famiglie numerose italiane, «Genus», vol. III, n. 1–2, (1938);
- Un nuovo indice di efficienza biologico-demografica: la durata del parto, in Società Italiana di Statistica, Atti della VII Riunione Scientifica, Roma, (1943);
- La mortalità differenziale dei due sessi e le sue possibili cause, «Statistica», a. X, n. 3, (1950);
- Età pubere, età alla menopausa e durata del periodo fecondo,«Genus», vol. IX, n. 1–4, (1950–52);
- Le caratteristiche e i problemi dell’occupazione e della disoccupazione femminile, in Atti della Commissione parliamentare d’inchiesta sulla disoccupazione, vol. IV, t. 5, (1953);
- Fattori sociali ed omogenizzazione nel comportamento demografico, «Statistica», XV, 3, (1955);
- La rilevazione statistica delle migrazioni: problemi, osservazioni e proposte, «Statistica», XXIV, 3, (1964);
- Le tendenze della Demografie e le prospettive del suo sviluppo, «Genus», vol. XXIV, n. 1–4, (1968);
- La popolazione in Italia, Torino, Boringhieri, (1976);
- Procreazione, famiglia, lavoro della donna, Torino, Loescher, (1984);
- Fattori sociali ed omogenizzazione nel comportamento demografico, «Statistica», a. XV, n. 3, (1955);
- Caratteristiche territoriali della mortalità in Italia, in Società Italiana di Statistica, Atti della XX Riunione Scientifica, Roma, (1961);
- Le ricerche demografiche in funzione dei piani regionali di sviluppo economico, «Statistica», a. XXI, n. 3, (1961).
