= Christopher Collard =

British classical scholar (born 1934)

- Born: 1934 (age 91–92)

Academic work
- Discipline: Classics
- Sub-discipline: Ancient Greek literature
- Institutions: University of Liverpool; University of Kent at Canterbury; University College, Swansea

Christopher Collard (born 1934) is a British classical scholar, known for his work on the Greek tragic playwright Euripides.

== Biography ==
Collard was born in 1934. He obtained an M.Litt. at the University of Cambridge in 1963, with a critical edition of Euripides' Suppliants. His colleagues at the University of Liverpool, where he was at the time, encouraged him to develop this into a full commentary, and he drafted notes on the first three hundred lines of the play in 1963–1964, before moving to the new University of Kent at Canterbury in 1965. He completed his full two-volume edition and commentary in 1972, and it was published in 1975.

In 1975, Collard was appointed Professor of Classics at University College, Swansea, giving an inaugural lecture on "The Study of Greek Tragedy" in 1976, part of which is published in Collard's 2007 collection of essays on Euripides and tragedy.

From 1986, Collard was the editor responsible for organising texts, translations and commentaries of all Euripides' plays within the "Aris and Phillips Classical Texts" series; he himself contributed a commentary on Hecuba in 1991. In 2006, he became general editor of the whole series following the death of Malcolm Willcock. Collard retained this role until 2016, when Alan Sommerstein took over. The final Euripides volume, an edition of Iphigenia at Aulis by Collard and James Morwood, appeared in 2017.

Collard has collaborated with Martin Cropp on two volumes of texts with translation and commentary of Euripides' fragmentary plays in the "Aris and Phillips Classical Texts" series, which appeared in 1995 and 2004, and on the Loeb Classical Library edition of the fragments of Euripides, which appeared in 2008.

Collard retired from his Swansea professorship in 1996. In his retirement, he has been affiliated with the University of Oxford, in association with St Hilda's and Queen's colleges, and also with the Corpus Christi Classics Centre.

== Selected publications ==
=== Editions of ancient texts ===
- Collard, Christopher (1975). Euripides: Supplices. Bouma's Boekhuis.
- Collard, Christopher (1984). Euripides: Supplices. Teubner.
- Collard, Christopher (1991). Euripides: Hecuba. Aris and Phillips. ISBN 9780856682377.
- Collard, Christopher; Cropp, Martin J.; Lee, Kevin H. (1995). Euripides: Selected Fragmentary Plays, Volume I. Aris and Phillips. ISBN 9780856686191.
- Collard, Christopher (2002). Aeschylus: Oresteia. Oxford University Press. ISBN 9780199537815.
- Collard, Christopher; Cropp, Martin J.; Gibert, John C. (2004). Euripides: Selected Fragmentary Plays, Volume II. Aris and Phillips. ISBN 9780856686214.
- Collard, Christopher (2008). Aeschylus: Persians and Other Plays. Oxford University Press. ISBN 9780191518317.
- Collard, Christopher; Cropp, Martin J. (2008). Euripides: Fragments. Aegeus – Meleager. Harvard University Press. ISBN 9780674996250.
- Collard, Christopher; Cropp, Martin J. (2008). Euripides: Fragments. Oedipus – Chrysippus. Harvard University Press. ISBN 9780674996311.
- O'Sullivan, Patrick; Collard, Christopher (2013). Euripides: Cyclops, and Major Fragments of Greek Satyric Drama. Oxbow Books. ISBN 9781908343352.
- Collard, Christopher; Morwood, James (2017). Euripides: Iphigenia at Aulis. Oxbow Books. ISBN 9781911226475.

=== Reference work ===
- Collard, Christopher (2018). Colloquial Expressions in Greek Tragedy: Revised and Enlarged Edition of P. T. Stevens's Colloquial Expressions in Euripides. Franz Steiner. ISBN 9783515120555.

=== Collection of articles ===
- Collard, Christopher (2007). Tragedy, Euripides and Euripideans. Bristol Phoenix Press. ISBN 9781904675730.

=== Edited volume ===
- Finglass, Patrick J.; Collard, Christopher; Richardson, Nicholas J., eds. (2007). Hesperos: Studies in Ancient Greek Poetry Presented to Martin L. West on His Seventieth Birthday. Oxford University Press. ISBN 9780191713958.
