= Herbert Weir Smyth =

American classical scholar (1857–1937)

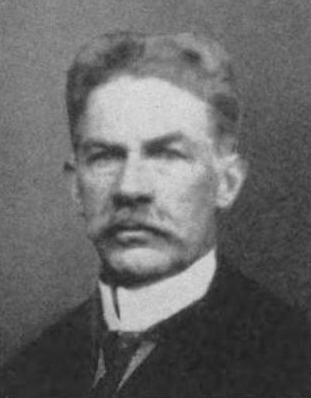
- Born: August 8, 1857 Wilmington, Delaware, United States
- Died: July 16, 1937 (aged 79) Bar Harbor, Maine, United States
- Resting place: Mount Auburn Cemetery
- Occupation: Classicist

Herbert Weir Smyth (August 8, 1857 – July 16, 1937) was an American classical scholar. His comprehensive grammar of Ancient Greek has become a standard reference on the subject in English, comparable to that of William Watson Goodwin, whom he succeeded as Eliott Professor of Greek Literature at Harvard University.

== Life ==
Herbert Weir Smyth was born in Wilmington, Delaware on August 8, 1857. He was educated at Swarthmore (A.B. 1876), Harvard (A.B. 1878), Leipzig, and Göttingen (Ph.D. 1884). From 1883 to 1885, he was instructor in Greek and Sanskrit at Williams College, and then for two years, he was reader in Greek at Johns Hopkins. From 1887 to 1901, he was professor of Greek at Bryn Mawr. In the latter year, he was called to Harvard as professor of Greek and in 1902, and he was appointed Eliott professor of Greek literature, succeeding Goodwin. From 1899 to 1900, he was professor of the Greek language and literature at the American Classical School at Athens. From 1889 to 1904, he was secretary of the American Philological Association and editor of its Transactions and in 1904 was elected president. He became a fellow of the American Academy of Arts and Sciences, a member of the American Philosophical Society and vice-president of the Egypt Exploration Society.

He died in Bar Harbor, Maine on July 16, 1937, and was buried at Mount Auburn Cemetery.

== Works ==
- The Dialects of North Greece – via Wikisource. (1887)
- The Sacred Literature of the Jains (1894, a translation)
- Sounds and Inflections of Greek Dialects I: The Ionic Dialect (Clarendon Press, 1894)
- Greek Melic Poets (McMillan, 1900)
- Beginner's Greek Book (1906) (with Allen Rogers Benner; American Book Company 1906)
- A Greek Grammar for Schools and Colleges (1916)
- Greek Grammar for Colleges (American Book Company, 1920)
- Aeschylean Tragedy – via Wikisource. (the second Sather Lecture in 1924)
- Aeschylus (Loeb edition): Vol. I – via Wikisource.; Vol. II – via Wikisource.
- "The Greek Language in its Relation to the Psychology of the Ancient Greeks" (read before the Congress of Arts and Sciences at the St. Louis Exposition in 1904)
- "Aspects of Greek Conservatism" (in Harvard Studies in Classical Philology, 1906)
- "Greek Conceptions of Immortality from Homer to Plato" (in Harvard Essays on Classical Subjects, 1912)

He was editor of the Greek Series for Colleges and Schools (20 volumes).
