= Theonoe =

In Greek mythology, Theonoe (Ancient Greek: Θεονόη, lit. 'divine wisdom' or 'she of god-like mind') was a name that may refer to the following women:

- Theonoe, daughter of the prophet Thestor, sister to Theoclymenus, Calchas and Leucippe.
- Theonoe, daughter to the Egyptian king Proteus
