= Amastris =

Amastris or Amestris may refer to:

== People ==
- Amastris (Amazon)
- Amastris (daughter of Oxyathres), Persian princess, wife of Dionysius of Heraclea
- Amestris, Persian queen, wife of Xerxes I, mother of Artaxerxes I
- Amastris, daughter of Artaxerxes II
- Amastris, daughter of Darius II, wife of Terituchmes

== Places ==
- Amastris (city), now Amasra, in ancient Paphlagonia
- Amestris (Fullmetal Alchemist), a fictional country in the anime and manga series Fullmetal Alchemist

== Other ==
- Amastris (treehopper), the type genus of the treehopper tribe Amastrini
