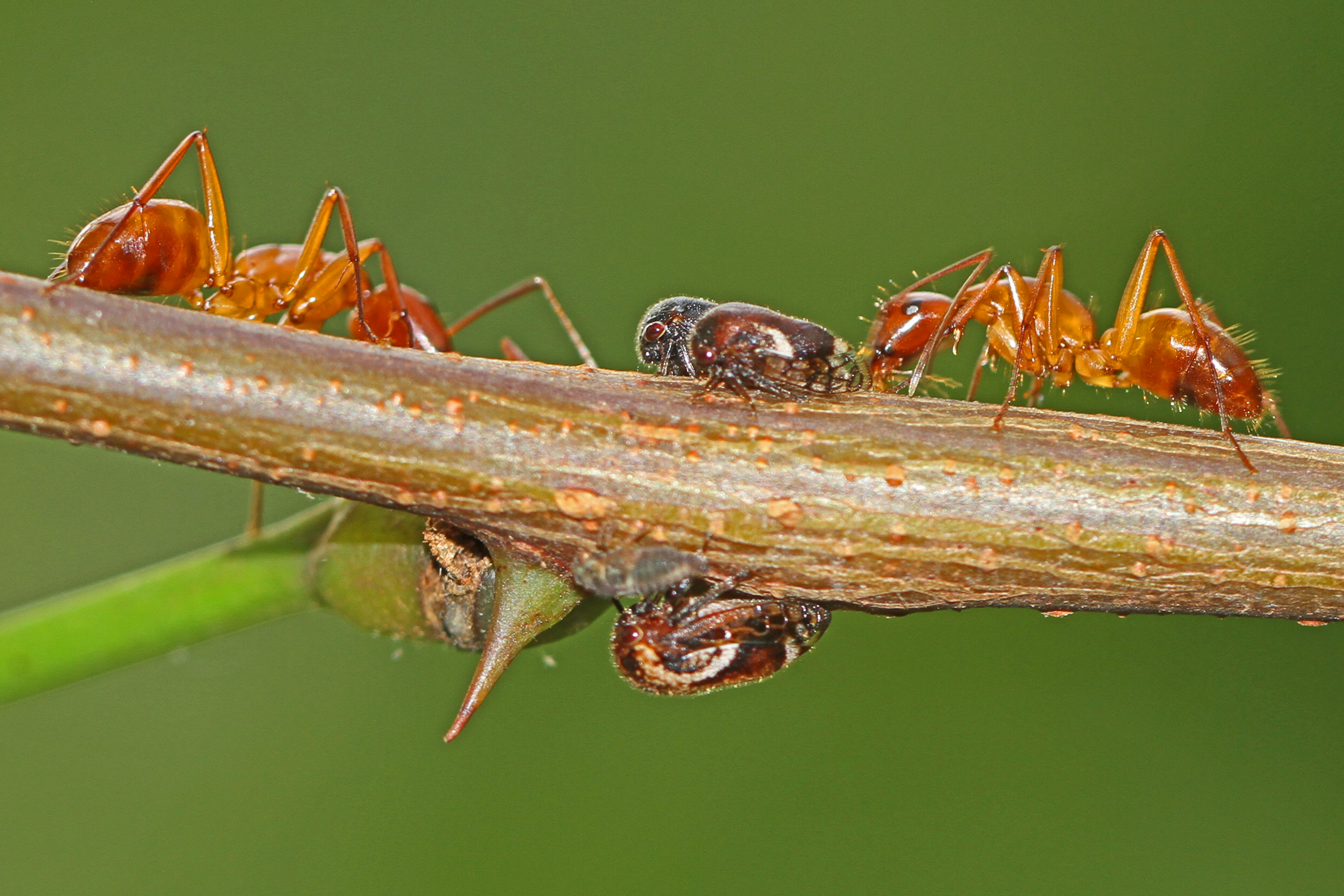
- Vanduzea arquata

Scientific classification
- Domain: Eukaryota
- Kingdom: Animalia
- Phylum: Arthropoda
- Class: Insecta
- Order: Hemiptera
- Suborder: Auchenorrhyncha
- Family: Membracidae
- Subfamily: Smiliinae
- Tribe: Amastrini oding, 1926

= Amastrini =

Tribe of treehoppers

Amastrini is a tribe of treehoppers in the family Membracidae.

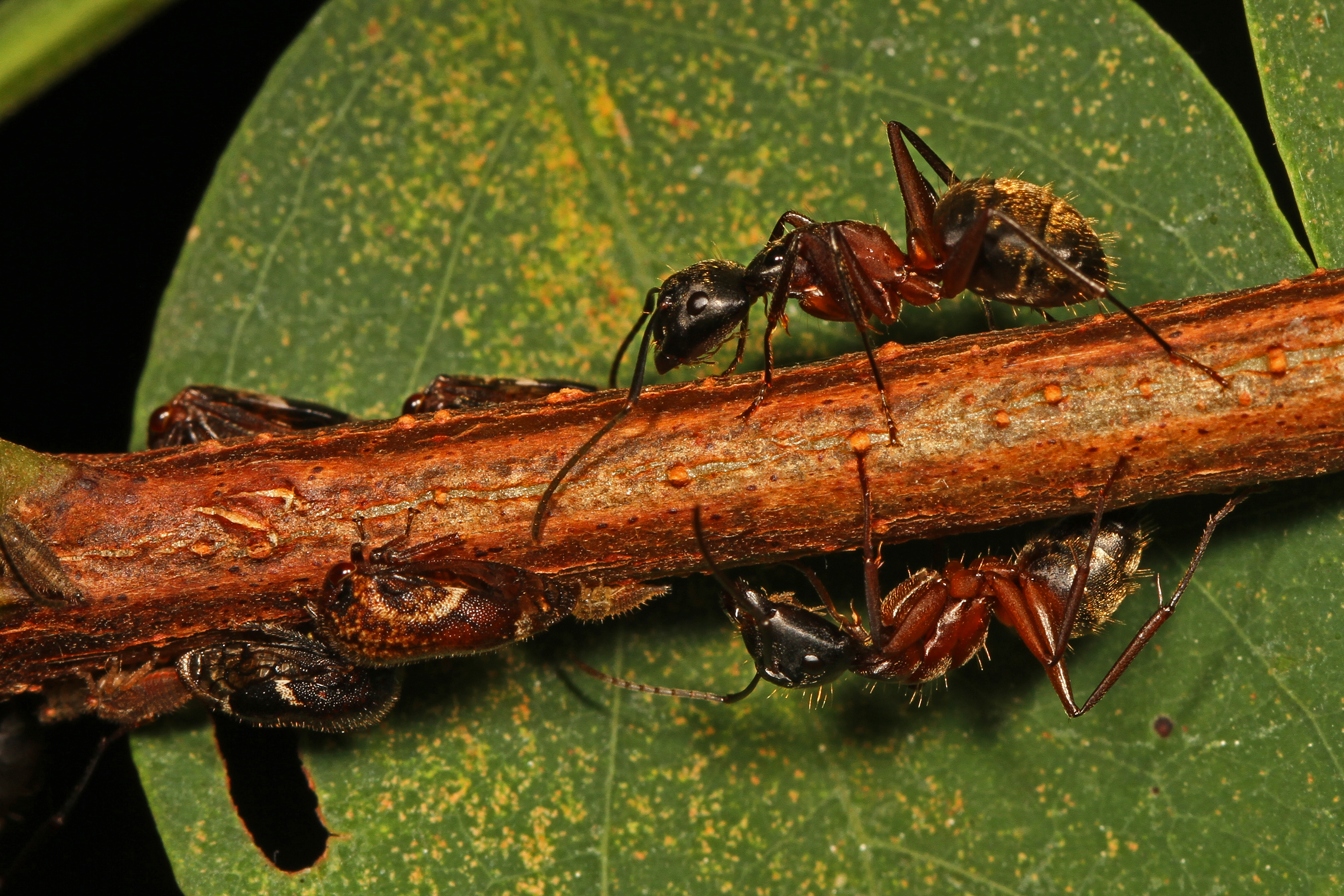
Vanduzea arquata

== Genera ==
- Amastris Stål, 1860^{c g b}
- Aurimastris
- Bajulata Ball, 1933^{c g b}
- Erosne
- Harmonides
- Hygris
- Idioderma Van Duzee, 1909^{c g b}
- Lallemandia
- Neotynelia
- Tynelia
- Vanduzea Goding, 1893^{c g b}

Data sources: i = ITIS, c = Catalogue of Life, g = GBIF, b = Bugguide.net
