= Vanduzea albifrons =

Scientific classification
- Domain: Eukaryota
- Kingdom: Animalia
- Phylum: Arthropoda
- Class: Insecta
- Order: Hemiptera
- Suborder: Auchenorrhyncha
- Family: Membracidae
- Genus: Vanduzea
- Species: V. albifrons

Binomial name
- Vanduzea albifrons Fowler, 1895

Species of insects

Vanduzea albifrons is a species of treehopper in the family Membracidae. It is found in North and Central America.
