= Theoclymenus =

Character of ancient Greek mythology

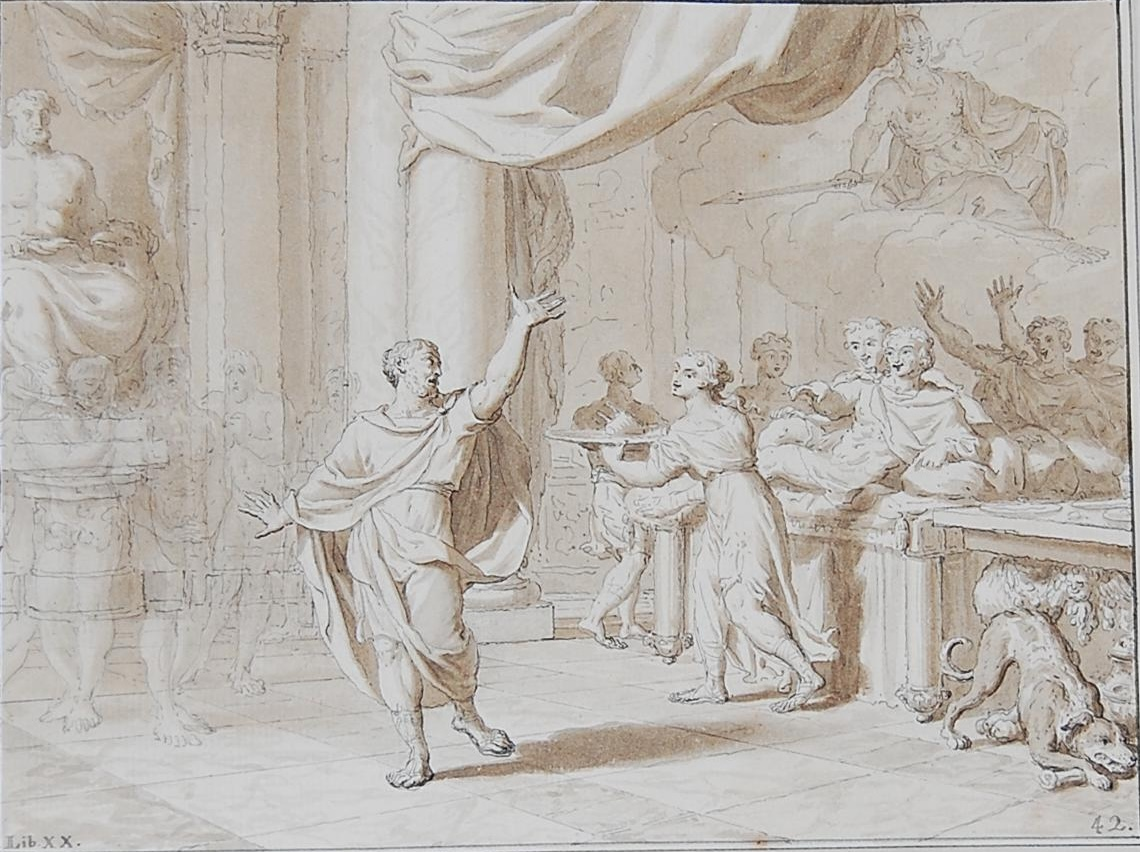
Drawing of Theoclymenus foretelling the destruction of Penelope's suitors by Tako Hajo Jelgersma

In Greek mythology, Theoclymenus (/ˌθiəˈklɪmɪnəs/; Ancient Greek: Θεοκλύμενος, romanized: Theoklúmenos, lit. 'god-renowned' or 'famed by god') was a prophet from Argos. He is a character in the Odyssey, in which he accompanies Telemachus from Pylos back to Ithaca. In the Odyssey, he foresees Odysseus' return to Ithaca and the death of Penelope's suitors, but he is not believed when he reveals these visions. Theoclymenus’s prophecy in the Odyssey may describe a real solar eclipse visible over the Ionian Islands on April 16, 1178 B.C.

== Family ==
Theoclymenus was the son of Polypheides and Aechme, daughter of Haemon, and brother of Harmonides. In some accounts, his parents were Thestor and possibly Polymele, and thus, the brother of Leucippe, Theonoe of Mycenae, and Calchas.

== Mythology ==
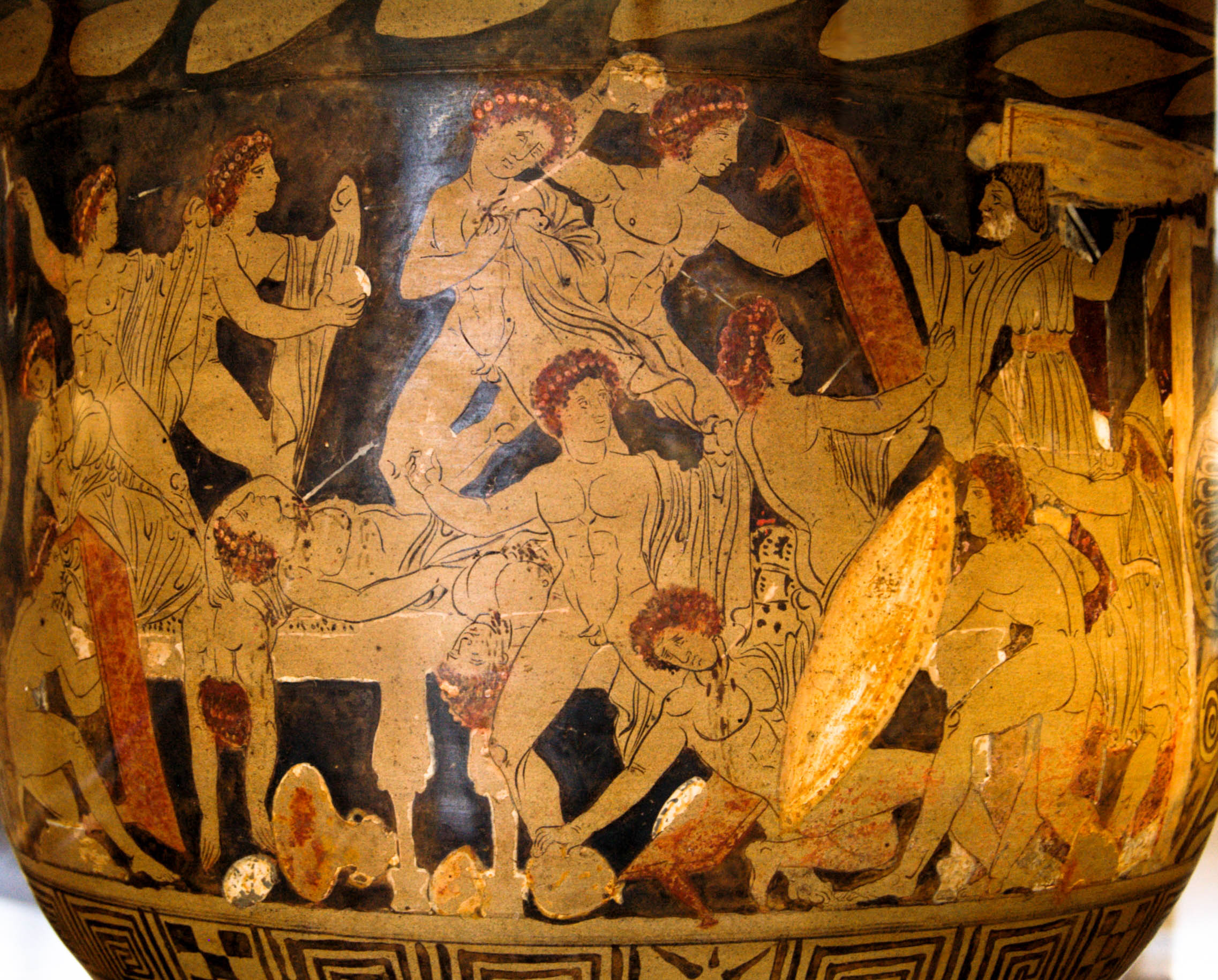
Slaughter of the suitors of Penelope. Side A from a red-figure bell-krater, ca. 330 BC

In the Odyssey, he escaped from Argos after killing one of his relatives. He fled to Pylos and sought refuge aboard the ship of Telemachus, who had come to inquire about the fate of his father, Odysseus. Telemachus obliged, and Theoclymenus accompanied him back to Ithaca. There, Theoclymenus interpreted the auspices of the birds, predicting that Telemachus would become head of the royal house of Ithaca. He also prophesied that Odysseus was already in Ithaca, disguised and watching as events unfolded. When he told Penelope of these signs, she did not believe him. Later, at dinner, he had a vision of the death of the suitors, but they laughed at his predictions, not knowing they would be killed that night.
