= Vanduzea laeta =

Scientific classification
- Domain: Eukaryota
- Kingdom: Animalia
- Phylum: Arthropoda
- Class: Insecta
- Order: Hemiptera
- Suborder: Auchenorrhyncha
- Family: Membracidae
- Genus: Vanduzea
- Species: V. laeta

Binomial name
- Vanduzea laeta Goding, 1893

Species of insect

Vanduzea laeta is a species of treehopper described by Frederic Webster Goding in 1893. It is commonly found between the months of May and August.

== Habitat ==
V. laeta is commonly found in the southwestern United States and in Central America, primarily Mexico, Guatemala, and Belize. It possibly has been introduced to Asia. It is a common pest of common sunflower and other species of the genus Helianthus.

== Appearance ==
It is commonly mistaken with V. segmentata. It is around 3–4 mm long.
