= Vanduzea brunnea =

Scientific classification
- Domain: Eukaryota
- Kingdom: Animalia
- Phylum: Arthropoda
- Class: Insecta
- Order: Hemiptera
- Suborder: Auchenorrhyncha
- Family: Membracidae
- Genus: Vanduzea
- Species: V. brunnea

Binomial name
- Vanduzea brunnea Fowler, 1895

Species of insects

Vanduzea brunnea is a species of treehopper belonging to the family Membracidae. It is found in Central and South America.
