= Vanduzea triguttata =

Scientific classification
- Kingdom: Animalia
- Phylum: Arthropoda
- Class: Insecta
- Order: Hemiptera
- Suborder: Auchenorrhyncha
- Family: Membracidae
- Genus: Vanduzea
- Species: V. triguttata

Binomial name
- Vanduzea triguttata Burmeister, 1836

Synonyms
- Entylia triguttata Burmeister, 1836; Acutalis triguttata Burmeister, 1836; Parmula triguttata Burmeister, 1836; Cyrtolobus annexus Townsend, 1892; Vanduzea vestita Goding, 1893

Species of treehopper

Vanduzea triguttata, also known as the three-spotted treehopper, is a species of treehopper belonging to the genus Vanduzea. It was first described by the German entomologist Ernst-Gerhard Burmeister in 1836.

== Description ==
V. triguttata is similar to Vanduzea arquata. Its pronotum is brown overall, with three white spots, hence the nickname three-spotted treehopper. Males are 3-3.5 millimeters long while females are 4 millimeters long.

== Habitat and diet ==
V. triguttata is found in southern and midwestern United States, southern Canada, Mexico, Colombia, Venezuela, and Guyana. Due to its unusually large range, it feeds on many types of trees, including:

- Eupatorium capillifolium
- Medicago sativa
- Quercus spp.
- Helianthus
- Psoralea tenuiflora
- Melilotu spp.
