= Pleisthenes =

Greek mythological figures

In Greek mythology, Pleisthenes or Plisthenes (Ancient Greek: Πλεισθένης, lit. 'most strength', 'greatest vigor' or 'most powerful'), is the name of several members of the house of Tantalus, the most important being a son of Atreus, said to be the father of Agamemnon and Menelaus. Although these two brothers are usually considered to be the sons of Atreus himself, according to some accounts, Pleisthenes was their father, but he died, and Agamemnon and Menelaus were adopted by their grandfather Atreus.

== Father of Agamemnon and Menelaus ==
The Pleisthenes who was said to have been the father of Agamemnon and Menelaus is a puzzling figure, with a confused genealogy, complicated by the existence of other members of the house of Tantalus with the same name. According to the usual version of the story, followed by the Iliad and Odyssey of Homer, Atreus, the king of Mycenae, was the father of Agamemnon and Menelaus, by Aerope, the daughter of the Cretan king Catreus. However, according to another tradition, Pleisthenes, the son of Atreus (or Pelops?) was the father, probably by Aerope, of Agamemnon and Menelaus, although some accounts have the mother as Cleolla or Eriphyle.

According to varying accounts, Pleisthenes's wife was Aerope, who he had received from the mariner hero Nauplius. Aerope's father Catreus, either because, he found her in bed with a slave, or because of an oracle which said that one of his children would kill him, gave Aerope to Nauplius, to be either drowned, or sold as a slave. However, in both versions of the story, Nauplius spared Aerope and gave her to Pleisthenes.

According to this tradition, apparently, Pleisthenes died young, and Agamemnon and Menelaus were raised by their grandfather Atreus. Such accounts were perhaps attempts to reconcile contradictory traditions.

== Other Pleisthenes ==
There were apparently other members of the house of Tantalus also named Pleisthenes:

- Pleisthenes, the son of Pelops. Some scholars have equated this Pleisthenes with the Pleisthenes who was the father of Agamenmnon and Menelaus.
- Pleisthenes, along with his brother Tantalus, were the infant sons of Thyestes and Aerope, who Atreus killed and served to Thyestes at a banquet.
- Pleisthenes, the son of Menelaus and Helen, who travelled with a son of Helen and Paris (named Aganus) to Cyprus. It is not mentioned when this happened, but is usually assumed to have occurred when Helen and Paris left for Troy. However, Jonathan Burgess believes a dating after the war to be more likely. He further speculates the pair formed part of a heroic genealogy for Cyprus.

== Sources ==
In Homer's Iliad and Odyssey, Pleisthenes is nowhere mentioned, and Agamemnon and Menelaus were the sons of Atreus However, from ancient commentators on the Iliad we are told of another tradition, followed by Hesiod, Aeschylus, Porphyry, and "others", in which Pleisthenes was the father of Agamemnon and Menelaus. An Iliad scholium says that, according to Hesiod, Agamemnon was the son of Pleisthenes and Aerope. Another Iliad scholium, citing Porphyry and "many others", says that Pleisthenes fathered Agamemnon and Menelaus, did nothing of note, and died young, with Atreus raising his sons.

Neither, of these Iliad scholia say who Pleisthenes' parents were, but Tzetzes' in his commentary on the Iliad, says that his father was Atreus and that, rather than being his wife, Aerope was his mother:

According to Hesiod, Aeschylus, and some others, Pleisthenes was the son of Atreus and Aerope, and the children of Pleisthenes and Dias’ daughter Cleolla were Agamemnon, Menelaus, and Anaxibia. Because Pleisthenes died young, they were brought up by their grandfather Atreus, and so they are considered by many to be Atreids.

In a scholium on Euripides' Orestes (which has sometimes been attributed to Hellanicus), Pleisthenes is again the son of Atreus, and the father of Agamemnon, Menelaus and Anaxibia, but Cleolla, rather than being Pleisthenes' wife, is his mother, and his wife is the otherwise unknown Eriphyle.

The patronymic "Pleisthenides" occurs in several ancient sources. Stesichorus uses it twice, probably referring to Menelaus, in one fragment (209 PMG), and Agamemnon, in another (219 PMG). Ibycus refers to Agamemnon as "the king Pleisthenides, leader of men, son of noble father Atreus" (282 PMG), which would seemingly make some Pleisthenes an ancestor of Atreus. Bacchylides, in the same poem, refers to Menelaus as both "Atreides" and "Pleisthenides". Aeschylus's Agamemnon, refers to Agamemnon's family as the Pleisthenidae ("house of Pleisthenes"), and the "race of Pleisthenes", although exactly which branch of Agamemnon's family is meant is unclear.

Pleisthenes was also the subject of Euripides's lost tragedy, Pleisthenes. A possible plot for the play is found in Hyginus, Fabulae 86:

Because Thyestes, son of Pelops and Hippodamia, lay with Aëropa, Atreus’ wife, he was banished from the kingdom by his brother Atreus. But he sent Atreus’ son, Plisthenes, whom he had reared as his own, to Atreus to be killed. Atreus, believing him to be his brother’s son, unknowingly killed his own son.

The mythographer Apollodorus gives an account of how Aerope came to be Pliesthenes' wife:

And Catreus gave Aerope and Clymene to Nauplius to sell into foreign lands; and of these two Aerope became the wife of Plisthenes, who begat Agamemnon and Menelaus;

However, elsewhere he has Aerope as the wife of Atreus, and Agamemnon and Menelaus as the sons of her and Atreus,

Scholia to Pindar's Olympian 1 mention a son, or bastard son, of Pelops, named Pleisthenes, which some scholars have identified with the Pleisthenes who was the father of Agamemnon and Menelaus.
