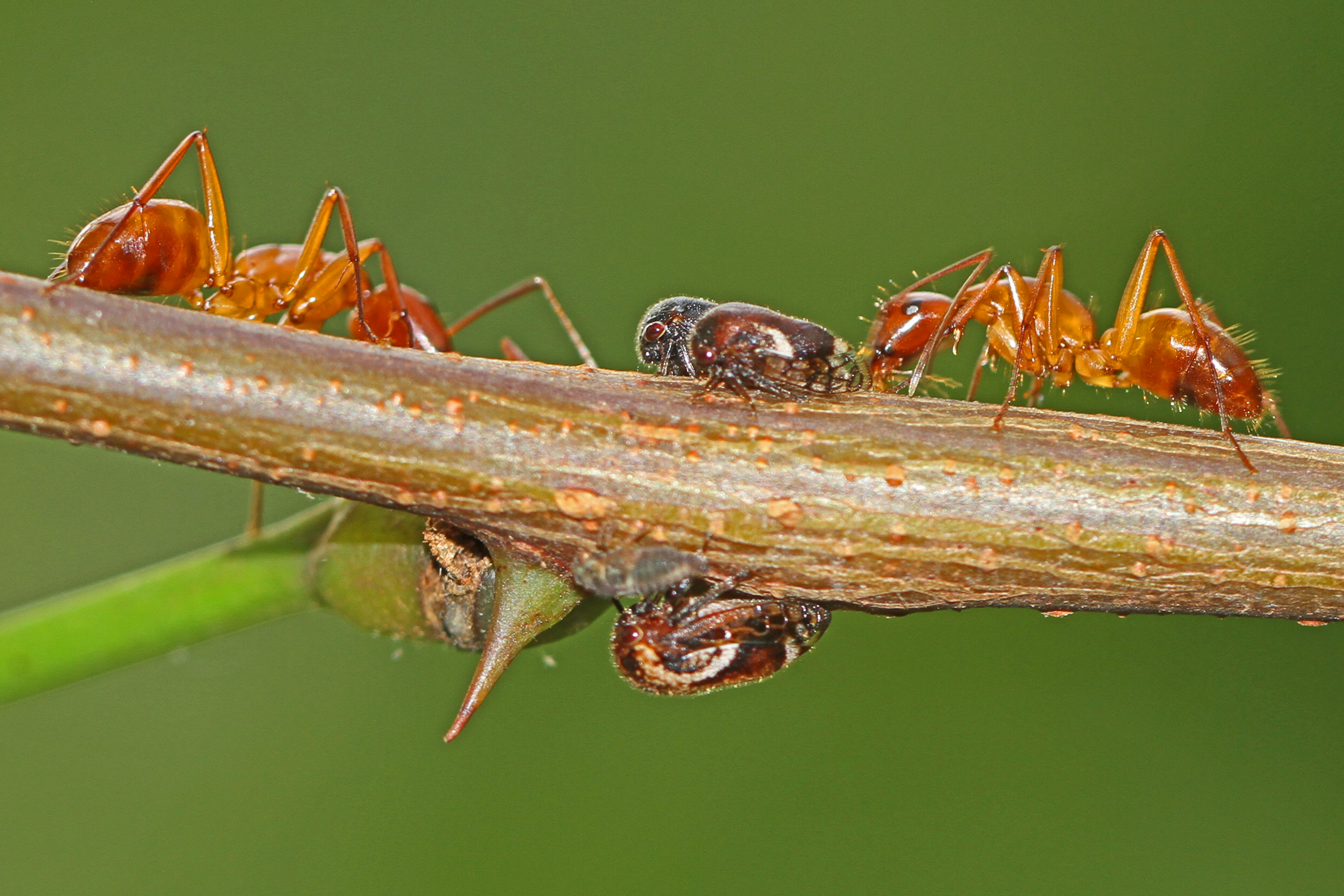
- Vanduzea arquata

Scientific classification
- Domain: Eukaryota
- Kingdom: Animalia
- Phylum: Arthropoda
- Class: Insecta
- Order: Hemiptera
- Suborder: Auchenorrhyncha
- Family: Membracidae
- Subfamily: Smiliinae
- Tribe: Amastrini
- Genus: Vanduzea; Goding, 1893

= Vanduzea =

Genus of treehoppers

Vanduzea is a genus of treehoppers in the family Membracidae. There are about 12 described species in Vanduzea. The genus was named after American entomologist Edward Payson Van Duzee.

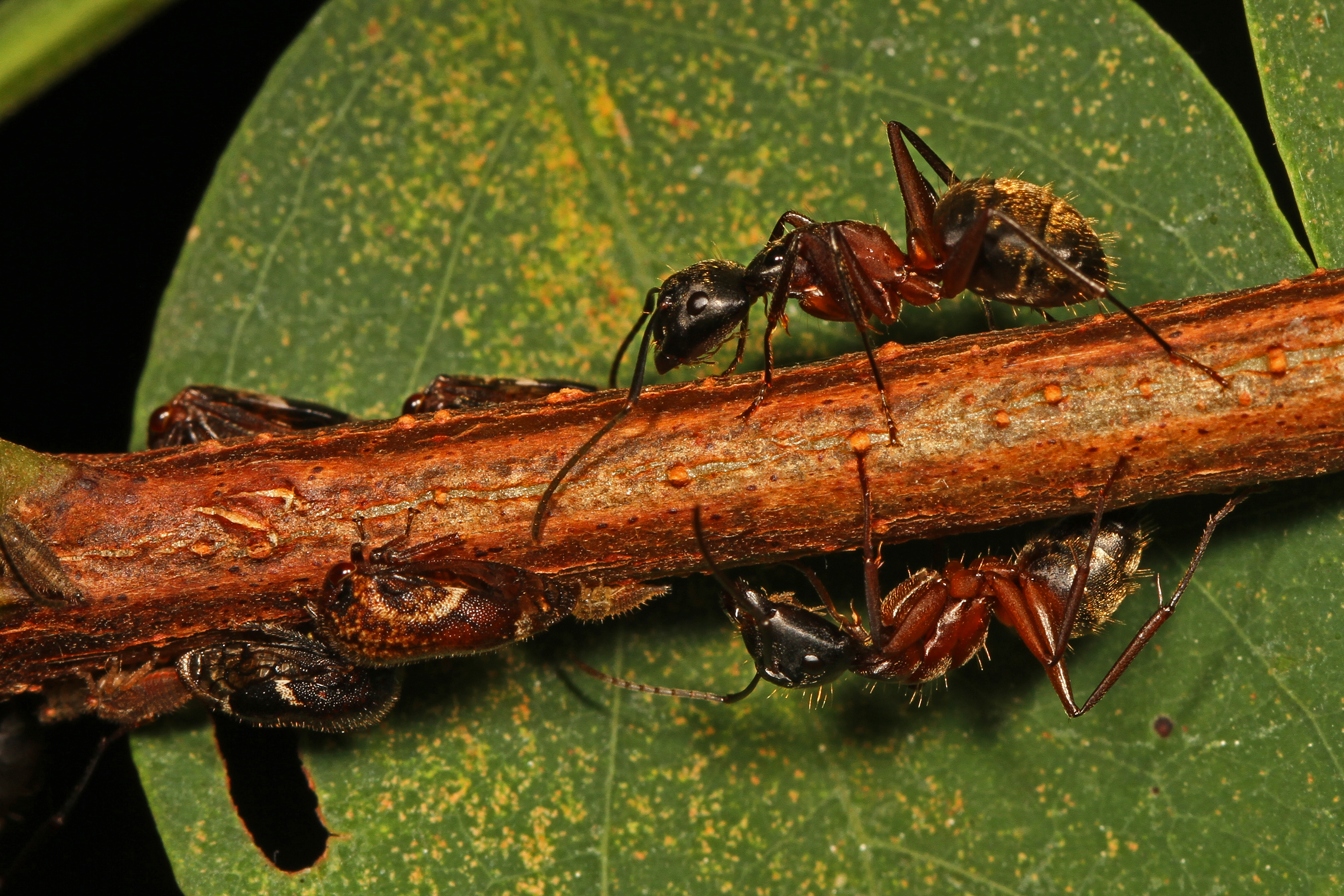
Vanduzea arquata

== Species ==
These 12 species belong to the genus Vanduzea:

- Vanduzea albifrons Fowler^{c g}
- Vanduzea arquata Say^{c g b} (black locust treehopper)
- Vanduzea brunnea Fowler^{c g}
- Vanduzea decorata Funkhouser^{c g}
- Vanduzea laeta Goding, 1894^{c g b}
- Vanduzea mayana Funkhouser^{c g}
- Vanduzea minor Fowler^{c g}
- Vanduzea punctipennis Funkhouser^{c g}
- Vanduzea segmentata (Fowler, 1895)^{c g b} (Van duzee treehopper)
- Vanduzea testudinea Haviland^{c g}
- Vanduzea triguttata Burmeister^{c g b} (three-spotted treehopper)
- Vanduzea variegata Fowler^{c g}

Data sources: i = ITIS, c = Catalogue of Life, g = GBIF, b = Bugguide.net
