= Aurimastris =

Scientific classification
- Domain: Eukaryota
- Kingdom: Animalia
- Phylum: Arthropoda
- Class: Insecta
- Order: Hemiptera
- Suborder: Auchenorrhyncha
- Family: Membracidae
- Subfamily: Smiliinae
- Tribe: Amastrini
- Genus: Aurimastris; Evangelista & Sakakibara, 2007

Type species
- Aurimastris expansa

Species
- Aurimastris expansa; Aurimasts otina

Genus of insects

Aurimastris is a genus of treehoppers belonging to the family Membracidae. It is the newest genus of the tribe Amastrini, having been described in 2007.
