= Aerope =

Princess from Greek mythology

- Queen of Mycenae
- Member of the Cretan Royal Family
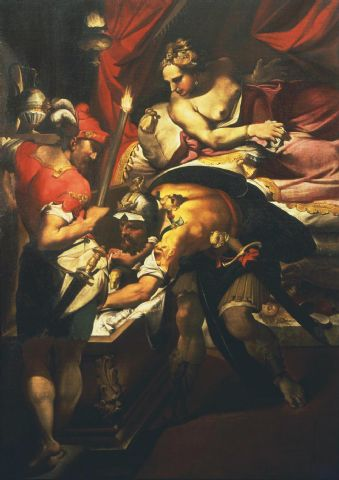
- Tiestes and Aérope by Nosadella
- Abode: Crete then Mycenae

Genealogy
- Parents: Catreus
- Siblings: Althaemenes, Apemosyne and Clymene
- Consort: (1) Atreus or Pleisthenes, (2) Thyestes
- Offspring: (1) Agamemnon, Menelaus, (2) Tantalus and Pleisthenes

In Greek mythology, Aerope (Ancient Greek: Ἀερόπη, romanized: Aërope, lit. 'with atmospheric face' or 'one with mist- or air-like appearance/ eyes') was a Cretan princess as the daughter of Catreus, king of Crete. She was the sister of Clymene, Apemosyne and Althaemenes. After an oracle said he would be killed by one of his children, Catreus gave Aerope to Nauplius to be sold abroad. Nauplius spared her, and she became the wife of Atreus or Pleisthenes (or both). By most accounts, she is the mother of Agamemnon and Menelaus. While the wife of Atreus, she became the lover of his brother Thyestes, and gave Thyestes the golden lamb that allowed him to become king of Mycenae.

== Family ==
Aerope's father was Catreus, son of Minos, and king of Crete. Catreus had two other daughters, Clymene and Apemosyne, and a son, Althaemenes.

In most accounts, Aerope was the mother of Agamemnon and Menelaus, fathered by Atreus. However, their father is occasionally named as Pleisthenes. In other retellings, Aerope was instead the mother of Pleisthenes by Atreus. When Pleisthenes died young, his sons, Agamemnon and Menelaus, were adopted by Atreus. In others, Aerope was the wife of both Atreus and Pleisthenes, having married Atreus after Pleisthenes died, with Atreus adopting her children from the first marriage. Such accounts were perhaps attempts to reconcile separate traditions.

According to Hyginus, Aerope was the mother of two sons, Tantalus and Pleisthenes, fathered by Thyestes. He claims these were the children that Atreus famously fed to Thyestes. Additionally, Aerope has also been named as the mother of a daughter, Anaxibia.

== Mythology ==
=== In Crete ===
According to the tradition followed by Euripides in his lost play Cretan Women (Kressai), Catreus found Aerope in bed with a slave and handed her over to Nauplius to be drowned. Instead, Nauplius spared Aerope's life and she married Pleisthenes. Sophocles, in his play Ajax, may also refer to Aerope's father finding her in bed with a man and handing her over to Nauplius to be drowned. However, the potentially corrupt text may instead refer to Aerope's husband Atreus finding her in bed with Thyestes, and having her drowned (see below).

The mythographer Apollodorus followed a different tradition, with no mention of any sexual transgression. In his account, Catreus gave Aerope and her sister Clymene to Nauplius to be sold off in foreign lands after an oracle prophesied that he would be killed by one of his children. Aerope's brother Althaemenes also found out about the prophecy, and fearing that he would be the one to kill Catreus, fled to Rhodes with Apemosyne. In this telling, Aerope eventually becomes the wife of Pleisthenes.

=== In Mycenae ===
From Crete, Aerope was taken to Mycenae. There, while the wife of Atreus, she became the lover of Atreus' twin brother Thyestes, involving herself in the brothers' power struggle for the kingship of Mycenae.

Atreus and Thyestes were the sons of Pelops and Hippodamia, king and queen of Pisa. Their desire for their father's throne led to the murder of their half-brother Chrysippus, for which they were banished, and sought refuge in Mycenae. According to Hyginus, the brothers were encouraged to commit the act by their mother Hippodamia, who killed herself upon being accused of doing so. When the Perseid dynasty came to an end, the Myceneans received a prophesy saying they should choose a son of Pelops as their king. Aerope stole the golden lamb (a portent linked to the kingship of Mycenae) from her husband Atreus and gave it to Thyestes, so that the Myceneans would choose Thyestes as their king.

From Byzantine period annotations to Euripides' Orestes, we learn that, in some unspecified Sophocles work, Atreus cast Aerope into the sea in revenge for her adultery and theft of the golden lamb.

== Sources ==
=== Early ===
Mentions of Aerope apparently occurred as early as "Homer" and "Hesiod". An Iliad scholium tells us that:

According to Homer, Agamemnon was the son of Pelops’ son Atreus, and his mother was Aerope; but according to Hesiod he was the son of Pleisthenes [and Aerope?].

Since Aerope is not in Homer's Iliad or Odyssey (where Agamemnon and Menelaus were the sons of Atreus, with no mother mentioned), the scholiast is presumably taking the Homeric reference from somewhere in the Epic Cycle, which was also attributed to Homer.

Fragmentary lines from the Hesiodic Catalogue of Women seem to make Aerope, (without naming a father) the mother of three sons Agamemnon, Menelaus (and Anaxibios?). While the Byzantine scholar John Tzetzes says that according to "Hesiod", Aerope was, by Atreus, the mother of Pleisthenes.

=== Fifth century BC ===
The story of Aerope, Atreus and Thyestes, was popular in Greek tragedy, however no complete plays on the story survive. Aeschylus' play Agamemnon contains several obscure allusions to the story, which indicate that, by at least 458 BC, the story was well known. In that play, Cassandra hints at Aerope's affair with Thyestes, where he is referred to as "the one who defiled" his "brother's bed".

There are many references to Aerope in the plays of Euripides. She was apparently an important character in his lost tragedy Cretan Women. The play told how Aerope was "secretly violated by a servant", and that when her father discovered this, he gave her to Nauplius to be drowned, but instead Nauplius gave her in marriage to Pleisthenes. According to the scholiast on Aristophanes' Frogs 849, her behavior in the play was "like a whore's". This, along with Euripides treatment of other "profligate women" suggests that the play dealt with Aerope's seduction of Thyestes, rather than Thyestes' seduction of Aerope. Although she was given to Pleisthenes as his wife, in his Cretan Women, in his plays Orestes, and Helen, Euripides has Agamemnon and Menelaus as the sons of Aerope and Atreus. Also in his Orestes, he refers to the "treacherous love of Cretan Aerope in her treacherous marriage", while in his Electra, he tells us that Thyestes, "persuaded Atreus' own wife to secret love, and carried off to his house the portent; coming before the assembly he declared that he had in his house the horned sheep with fleece of gold." Euripides possibly also wrote a play Thyestes.

Sophocles, in his play Ajax, refers to Aerope being found in bed with a lover, and ordered drowned by someone's "father". As the text stands, the "father" is Aerope's, and the reference is to Catreus giving her to Nauplius to be drowned, as in Euripides’ Cretan Women. However, a small "correction" to the text would make the father Agamemnon's, and the reference would then be to Atreus finding Aerope in bed with Thyestes. There were several other plays by Sophocles, all lost, which presumably also dealt with the story: Atreus, Thyestes (possibly more than one), and Thyestes in Sicyon. Byzantine scholia to Euripides' Orestes 812, possibly referring to the passage from the Ajax noted above, say that in some (unnamed) play by Sophocles, Atreus "revenged himself on his wife Aerope (both because of her adultery with Thyestes and because she gave away the lamb) by casting her into the sea".

Agathon, wrote a play titled Aerope (and a Thyestes), and perhaps so did the younger Carcinus. We are told that in some such play, Alexander of Pherai was moved to tears by the performance of the actor Theodorus as Aerope, suggesting a sympathetic portrayal.

=== Late ===
The Roman mythographer Hyginus has Agamemnon as the son of Aerope and Atreus and Tantalus and Plethenes as the sons of Aerope and Thyestes, with these being the children that Atreus fed to Thyestes.

In Ovid's Ars Amatoria, Aerope is given as one of several examples of "women's lust" being "keener" than men's and having "more of madness":

Had the Cretan woman abstained from love for Thyestes (and is it such a feat to be able to do without a particular man?), Phoebus had not broken off in mid-career, and wresting his car about turned round his steeds to face the dawn.

The mythographer Apollodorus gives the following account:

Catreus, son of Minos, had three daughters, Aerope, Clymene, and Apemosyne, and a son, Althaemenes. When Catreus inquired of the oracle how his life should end, the god said that he would die by the hand of one of his children. ... And Catreus gave Aerope and Clymene to Nauplius to sell into foreign lands; and of these two Aerope became the wife of Plisthenes, who begat Agamemnon and Menelaus.

However elsewhere he says that Agamemnon and Menelaus were the sons of Aerope and Atreus and that

the wife of Atreus was Aerope, daughter of Catreus, and she loved Thyestes. And Atreus once vowed to sacrifice to Artemis the finest of his flocks; but when a golden lamb appeared, they say that he neglected to perform his vow, and having choked the lamb, he deposited it in a box and kept it there, and Aerope gave it to Thyestes, by whom she had been debauched.

== Similarities with Auge and Danae ==
Stories of Aerope share key elements with those of Auge and Danae. These elements include prophesies of death, daughters' sexual impurity, and punishment by their fathers by either being cast into the sea or given away to be sold overseas.

Auge was the daughter of Aleus, king of Tegea, and the mother of the hero Telephus. According to one version of the story, Aleus had received a prophesy that his sons would be killed by the son of Auge. In response, Aleus made Auge a priestess of Athena, a role which required her to remain a virgin. Nevertheless, she became pregnant by Heracles. Then, by various accounts, she was either cast into the sea or given to Nauplius to be either drowned or sold overseas. However, regardless of the telling, she ends up in Mysia as the wife of King Teuthras.

Danae was the daughter of Acrisius, king of Argos, and the mother of the hero Perseus. An oracle told Acrisius that he would be killed by the son of Danae, so he locked her away. Nevertheless, Danae became pregnant by Zeus and gave birth to their son Perseus. In response, Acrisius locked her and her son in a wooden chest and cast it into the sea, hoping to kill them without invoking the wrath of the gods. They survived through Zeus and Poseidon's intervention, and washed up on the shores of Seriphos.
