= Atabyrius =

Epithet of the Greek god Zeus

Atabyrius (Ancient Greek: Ἀταβύριος) was a cultic epithet of the god Zeus from Greek mythology, under which he was probably worshipped in the form of a bull.

This was a toponymic surname derived from Mount Atabyris or Atabyrion (modern Attavyros) on the island of Rhodes, near the city of Kameiros (modern Camirus). In mythology, the Cretan Althaemenes was said to have built a temple to this aspect of the god.

The cult was widespread, and may have had Cretan or Phoenician or Theban origins (owing to the prevalence of bovine figures in Theban myth). It was written that upon this mountain there were brazen bulls which roared when anything extraordinary was going to happen.

The poet Pindar, in the late 6th and early 5th century BCE, was the first to mention this association of Zeus with this mountain, and the historian Diodorus Siculus writes that in his own time, in the 1st century BCE, Zeus Atabyrius was being worshipped in the city of Agrigentum, Sicily, more than a thousand miles away from Rhodes. Because of this, the historian Polybius assumed that Agrigentum must have originally been a Rhodian colony.

We have evidence of an urban shrine to Atabyrius whose priest, Eulimenus, was a demosios (public slave), and that the cult of which was composed of the slaves of the city.

The brazen bull torture device reputedly used by the 6th century tyrant of Agrigentum Phalaris may have been an idol of Zeus Atabyrius. The poet and novelist Robert Graves in several of his nonfiction works speculatively identifies Atabyrius with the golden calf of the historical Israelites, by way of claiming that Atabyrius was a local re-skinning of the Hurrian storm god Teshub. This claim does not enjoy broad scholarly support.
