= Althaemenes =

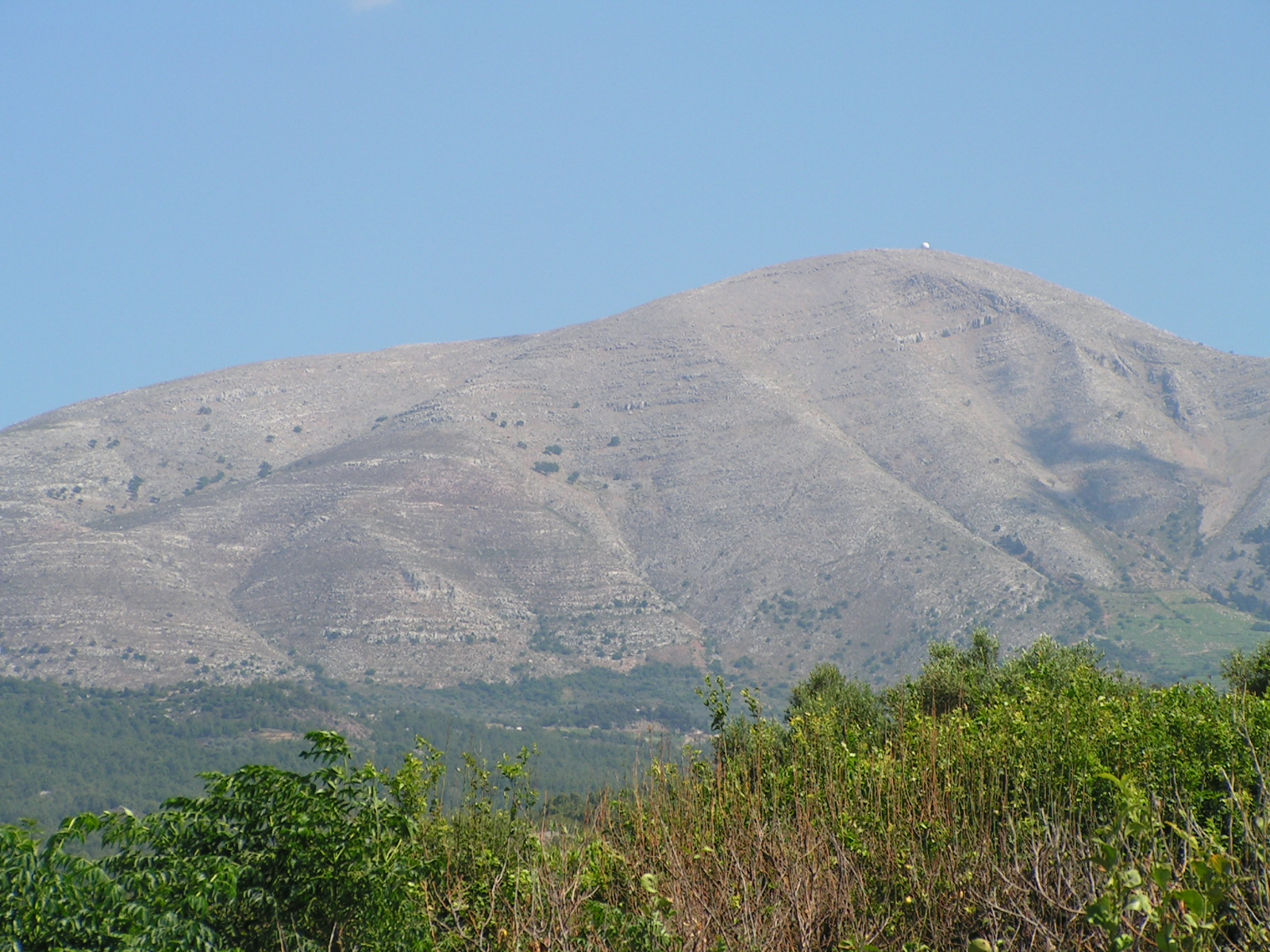
Attavyros mountain, the place Althemenes fled to

In Greek mythology, Althaemenes or Althemenes (Ancient Greek: Ἀλθαιμένης) was a Cretan prince as the only son of King Catreus of Crete. He was the brother of Apemosyne, Aerope and Clymene. Althaemenes mistakenly killed his father thereby fulfilling an oracle.

== Mythology ==
Althaemenes is known through the accounts of Diodorus Siculus and Apollodorus. According to the first of these, Althaemenes received an oracle saying that he was destined to kill his father. So to avoid this fate, Althaemenes, with many followers, fled Crete for Rhodes, and established on Mount Atabyrus (modern Attavyros) an altar to Zeus Atabyrius. Years later, Catreus sailed the seas searching for his son, and heir to his throne. One night, his ship stopped at Rhodes, fighting arose, and Althaemenes, unknowingly killed Catreus with his spear. When Althaemenes discovered what he had done, he wandered from place to place, and eventually died from grief. After which, commanded by an oracle, the Rhodians honored him as a hero.

Apollodorus relates a similar story. In his account, Catreus received an oracle saying that he would be killed by one of his children. And although Catreus hid the oracles, Althaemenes found out and fled with his sister Apemosyne to Rhodes. There Apemosyne was raped by the god Hermes, but when Apemosyne told Althaemenes this, Althaemenes did not believe her and kicked Apemosyne to death. Catreus having set to sea in search of Althaemenes, landed at Rhodes, and his company being mistaken for pirates were attacked and as before Althaemenes unknowingly killed his father. In this telling, when Althaemenes realized what had happened he prayed to the gods and fell into a chasm.
