= Agamemnon =

Figure in Greek mythology

- King of Mycenae; Commander of the Achaeans
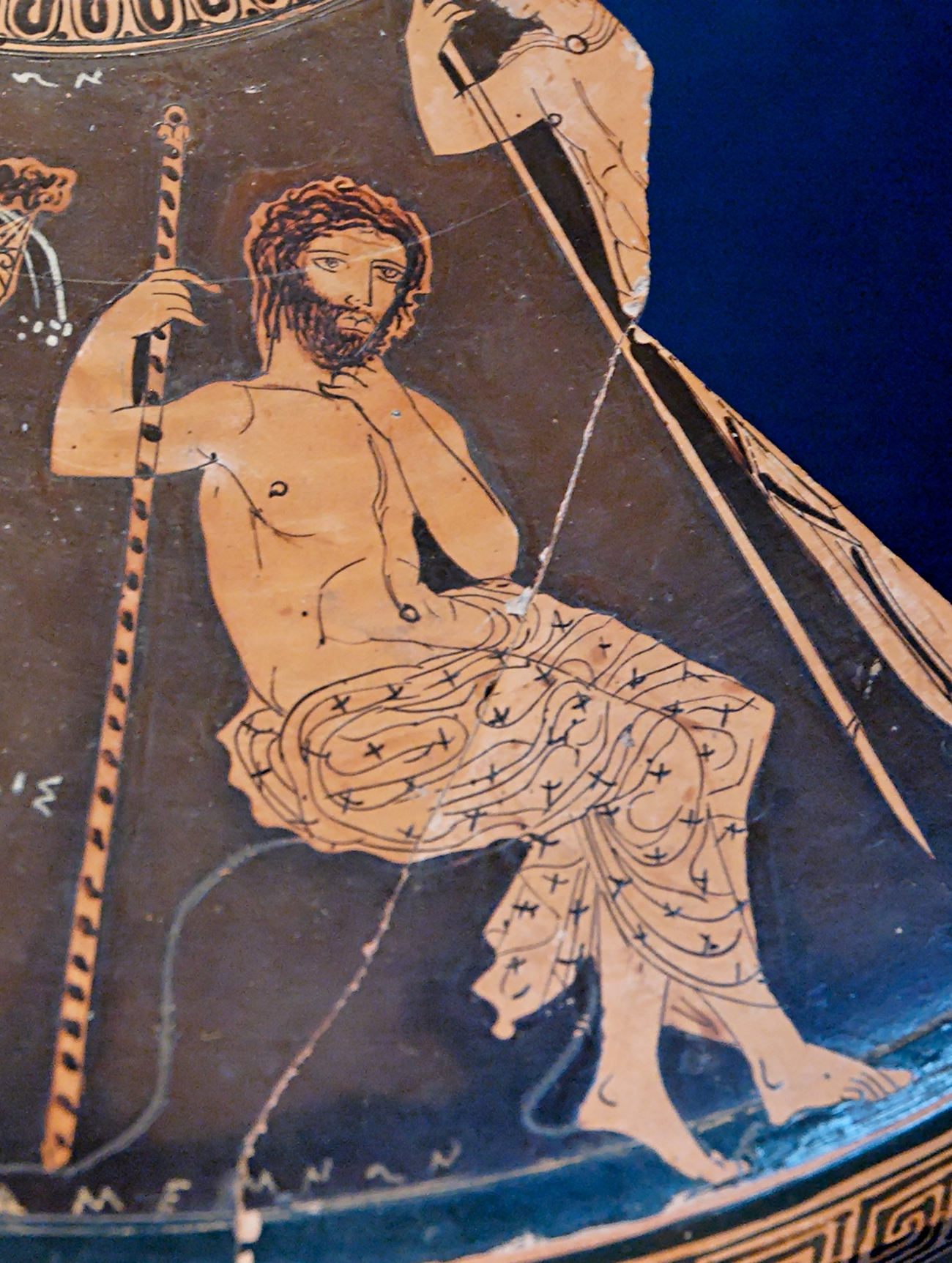
- Fifth century BC depiction of Agamemnon seated while holding his scepter.

Genealogy
- Parents: Atreus or Pleisthenes (father); Aerope or Cleolla (mother)
- Siblings: Menelaus, Anaxibia
- Spouse: Clytemnestra
- Offspring: Orestes, Iphigenia, Electra, Chrysothemis, Iphianassa, Chryses, Halaesus
- Dynasty: Atreid Dynasty

In Greek mythology, Agamemnon (/æɡəˈmɛmnɒn/; Ancient Greek: Ἀγαμέμνων Agamémnōn) was a king of Mycenae who commanded the Achaeans during the Trojan War. He was the son (or grandson) of King Atreus and Queen Aerope, the brother of Menelaus, the husband of Clytemnestra, and the father of Iphigenia, Iphianassa, Electra, Laodike, Orestes and Chrysothemis. Legends make him the king of Mycenae and Argos, depending on the source. It is thought that Argos might point to the rural area or state of Mycenae, the actual city . Agamemnon was killed upon his return from Troy by Clytemnestra, or in an older version of the story, by Clytemnestra's lover Aegisthus.

== Etymology ==
Different etymologies have been proposed for the name Agamemnon (Ἀγαμέμνων). According to one view, the name means 'very steadfast', 'unbowed' or 'resolute'. This is based on the interpretation of the name as a compound word comprising the elements ἄγαν 'very much' and μένω 'to stay, wait; stand fast'. According to another view, the name developed from the unattested form *Ἀγαμέδμων (*Agamédmōn), a compound word composed of the elements ἄγαν 'very much' and μέδομαι 'to think on, provide for', with the overall meaning of 'very mindful'. Yet another proposal derives the second part of the compound word from μέμονα 'to be inclined, to wish eagerly, to strive' for the overall meaning of 'very eagerly wishing'. Linguist Václav Blažek proposes a relationship with Vedic Sanskrit Agni on etymological and functional bases.

== Ancestry and early life ==
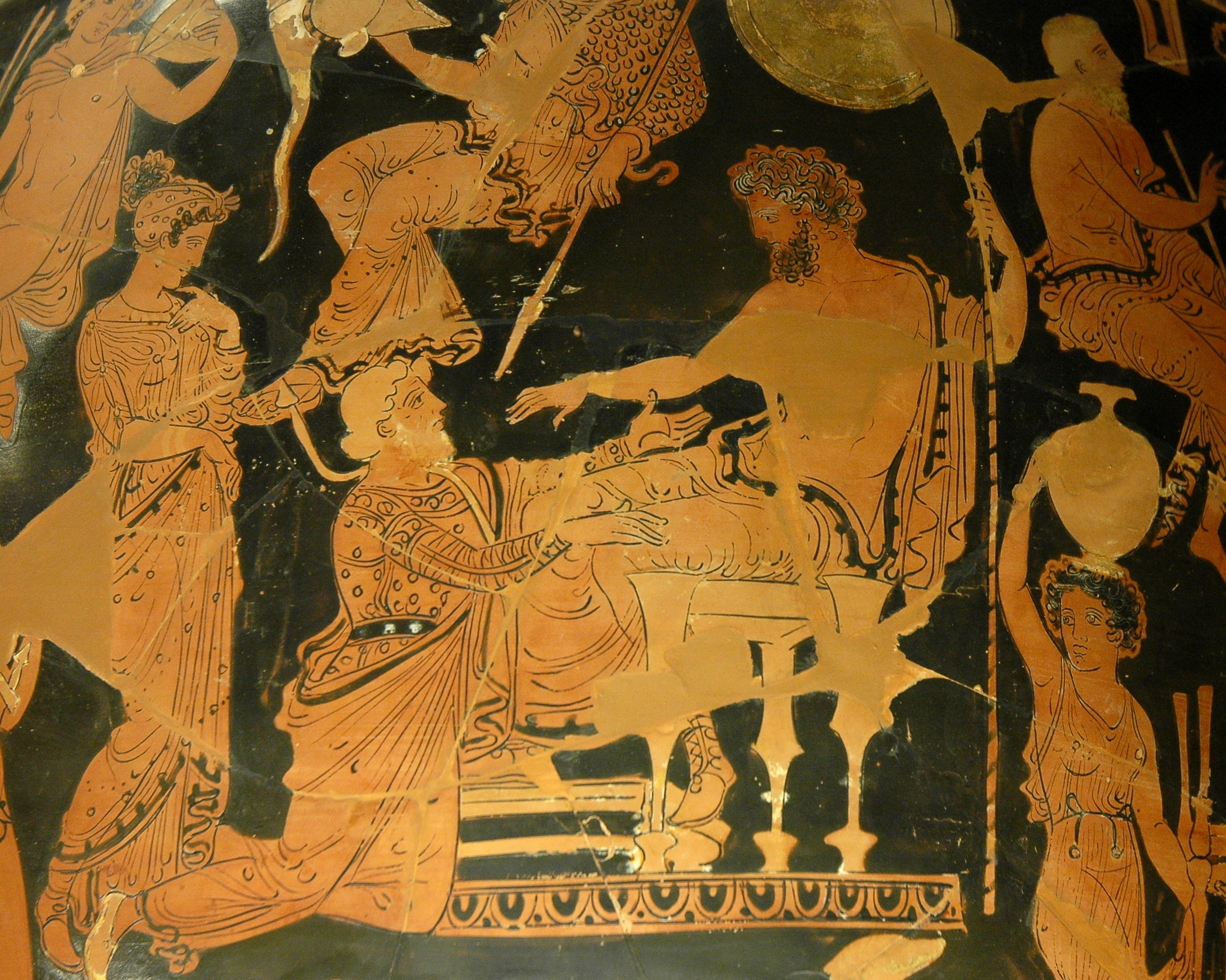
Fourth century BC depiction of Chryses attempting to ransom his daughter Chryseis from Agamemnon.

Agamemnon was a descendant of Pelops, son of Tantalus. According to the common story (as told in the Iliad and Odyssey of Homer), Agamemnon and his younger brother Menelaus were the sons of Atreus, king of Mycenae, and Aerope, daughter of the Cretan king Catreus. However, according to another tradition, Agamemnon and Menelaus were the sons of Atreus' son Pleisthenes, with their mother being Aerope, Cleolla, or Eriphyle. In this tradition, Pleisthenes dies young, with Agamemnon and Menelaus being raised by Atreus. Agamemnon had a sister Anaxibia (or Astyoche) who married Strophius, the son of Crisus.

Agamemnon's father, Atreus, murdered the sons of his twin brother Thyestes and fed them to Thyestes after discovering Thyestes' adultery with his wife Aerope. Thyestes fathered Aegisthus with his own daughter, Pelopia, and this son vowed gruesome revenge on Atreus' children. Aegisthus murdered Atreus, restored Thyestes to the throne, and took possession of the throne of Mycenae and jointly ruled with his father. During this period, Agamemnon and his brother Menelaus took refuge with Polypheides, Oeneus, and Tyndareus, King of Sparta. The latter brought the pair back to Mycenae where they drove out Thyestes.

In Sparta, Agamemnon and Menelaus respectively married Tyndareus' daughters Clytemnestra and Helen. In some stories (such as Iphigenia at Aulis by Euripides) Clytemnestra was already married to Tantalus, another son of Thyestes, whom Agamemnon murders along with the couple's infant son before marrying Clytemnestra. According to the Ehoiai, Menelaus was not present for the courting of Helen, but Agamemnon went on his behalf. His suit was successful because he was the greatest of the suitors in wealth. Menelaus succeeded Tyndareus as king of Sparta, while Agamemnon, with his brother's assistance, drove out Aegisthus and Thyestes to recover his father's kingdom. He extended his dominion by conquest and became the most powerful prince in Greece.

The number of children Agamemnon and Clytemnestra had varies according to source. In the Iliad, Agamemnon states that he has three daughters: Chrysothemis, Laodike, and Iphianassa. In Aeschylus' Oresteia, he has one son, Orestes, and two daughters, Iphigenia and Electra; Sophocles' Electra adds a daughter named Chrysothemis. Some also make Halaesus, an enemy of Aeneas in Italy, an illegitimate son of Agamemnon.

Agamemnon's family history had been tarnished by murder, incest, and treachery, consequences of the heinous crime perpetrated by his ancestor, Tantalus, and then of a curse placed upon Pelops, son of Tantalus, by Myrtilus, whom he had murdered. In Aeschylus' Oresteia, misfortune hounded successive generations of the House of Atreus, until atoned by Orestes in a court of justice held jointly by humans and gods.

== Trojan War ==
=== Sailing for Troy ===
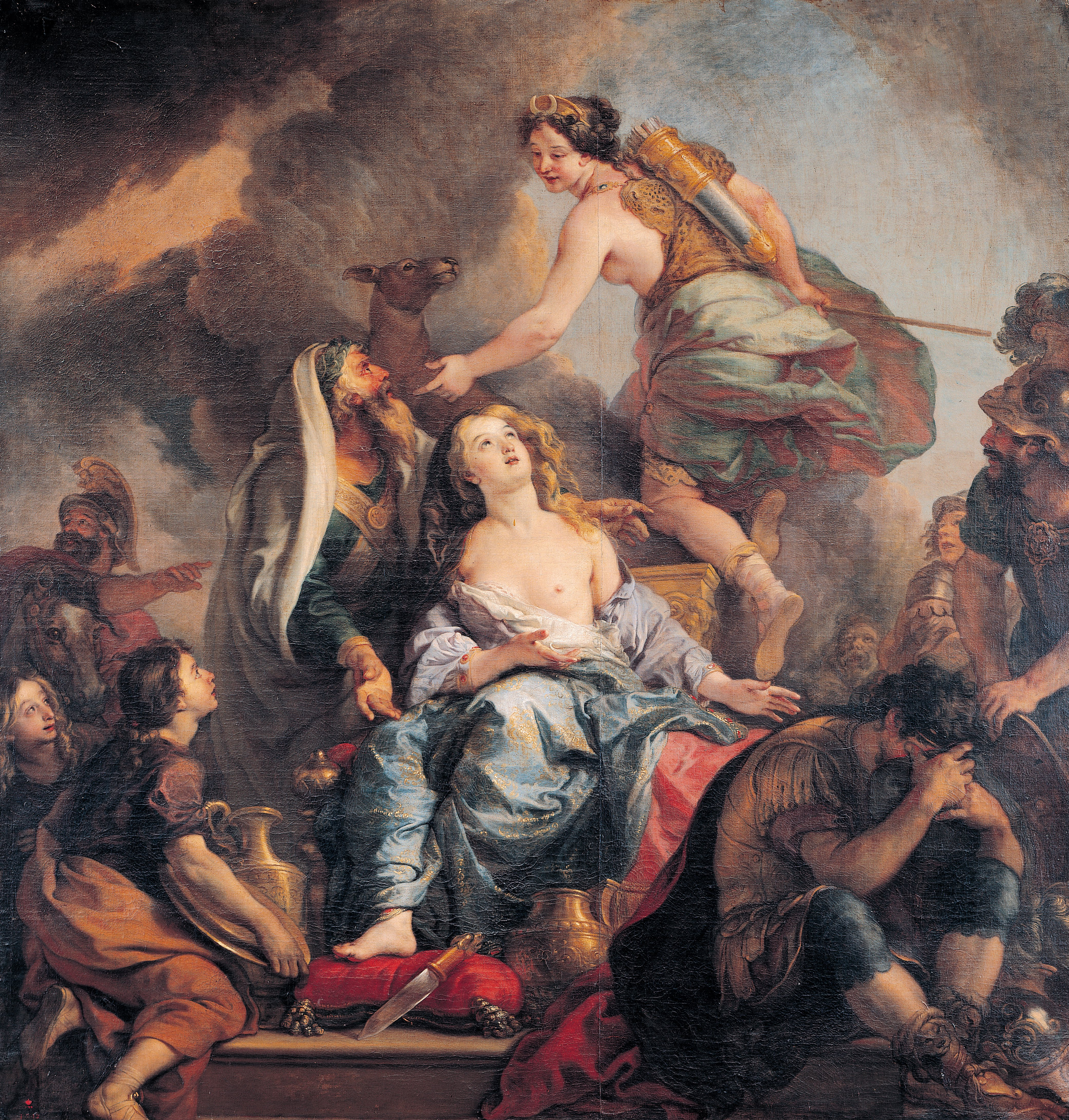
The Sacrifice of Iphigenia by Charles de La Fosse

Agamemnon gathers the reluctant Greek forces to sail for Troy. In order to recruit Odysseus, who is feigning madness so as to not have to go to war, Agamemnon sends Palamedes, who threatens to kill Odysseus' infant son, Telemachus. Odysseus is forced to stop acting mad in order to save his son and joins the assembled Greek forces. Preparing to depart from Aulis, a port in Boeotia, Agamemnon's army incurs the wrath of the goddess Artemis, although the myths give various reasons for this. In Aeschylus' play Agamemnon, Artemis is angry for she predicts that so many young men will die at Troy, whereas in Sophocles' Electra, Agamemnon has slain an animal sacred to Artemis, and subsequently boasts that he is her equal in hunting. Misfortunes, including a plague and a lack of wind, prevent the army from sailing. Finally, the prophet Calchas announces that the wrath of the goddess can only be propitiated by the sacrifice of Agamemnon's daughter Iphigenia.

Classical dramatizations differ on how willing either father or daughter are to this fate; some include such trickery as claiming she was to be married to Achilles, but Agamemnon does eventually sacrifice Iphigenia. Her death appeases Artemis and the Greek army set out for Troy. Several alternatives to the human sacrifice have been presented in Greek mythology. Other sources, such as Iphigenia at Aulis, say that Agamemnon is prepared to kill his daughter but that Artemis accepts a deer in her place and whisks her away to Tauris in the Crimean Peninsula. However, this version is widely considered to be the work of an interpolator, and not Euripides himself. Hesiod says she became the goddess Hecate.

During the war, but before the events of the Iliad, Odysseus contrives a plan to get revenge on Palamedes for threatening his son's life. By forging a letter from Priam, king of the Trojans, and caching some gold in Palamedes' tent, Odysseus has Palamedes accused of treason and Agamemnon orders him to be stoned to death.

=== The Iliad ===
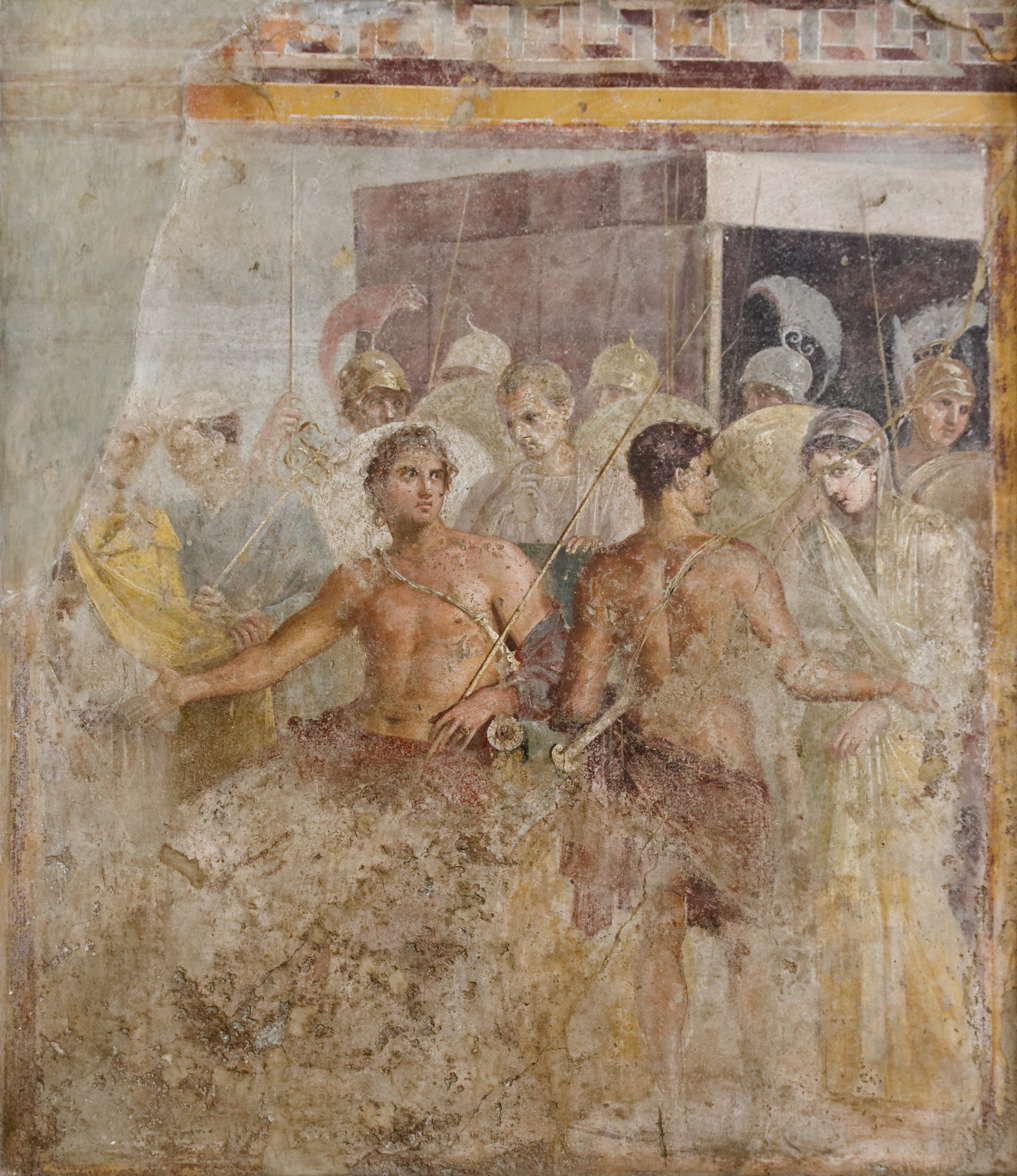
Achilles' surrender of Briseis to Agamemnon, from the House of the Tragic Poet in Pompeii, fresco, 1st century AD, now in the Naples National Archaeological Museum

The Iliad tells the story of the quarrel between Agamemnon and Achilles in the final year of the war. In Book One, following one of the Achaean army's raids, Chryseis, daughter of Chryses, one of Apollo's priests, is taken as a war prize by Agamemnon. Chryses pleads with Agamemnon to free his daughter but meets with little success. Chryses then prays to Apollo for the safe return of his daughter. Apollo responds by unleashing a plague over the Achaean army. The prophet Calchas tells that the plague may be dispelled by returning Chryseis to her father. After bitterly berating Calchas for his painful prophecies, which first forced him to sacrifice his daughter and now to return his concubine, Agamemnon reluctantly agrees. However, Agamemnon demands a new prize from the army as compensation and seizes Achilles' prize, the beautiful captive Briseis. This creates deadly resentment between Achilles and Agamemnon, causing Achilles to withdraw from battle and refuse to fight.

Agamemnon is then visited in a dream by Zeus who tells him to rally his forces and attack the Trojans (in Book Two). After several days of fighting, including duels between Menelaus and Paris, and between Ajax and Hector, the Achaeans are pushed back to the fortifications around their ships. In Book Nine, Agamemnon, having realized Achilles's importance in winning the war, sends ambassadors begging for Achilles to return, offering him riches and the hand of his daughter in marriage. Achilles refuses, only being spurred back into action when his companion Patroclus is killed in battle by Hector, eldest son of King Priam and Queen Hecuba. In Book Nineteen, Agamemnon, reconciled with Achilles, gives him the offered rewards for returning to the war. Achilles sets out to turn back the Trojans and to duel with Hector. After Hector's death, Agamemnon assists Achilles in performing Patroclus' funeral in Book Twenty-three. Agamemnon volunteers for the javelin throwing contest, one of the games being held in Patroclus' honor, but his skill with the javelin is so well known that Achilles awards him the prize without contest.

Although not the equal of Achilles in bravery, Agamemnon was a representative of "kingly authority". As commander-in-chief, he summoned the princes to the council and led the army in battle. His chief fault was his overwhelming haughtiness; an over-exalted opinion of his position that led him to insult Chryses and Achilles, thereby bringing great disaster upon the Greeks.

Agamemnon was the commander-in-chief of the Greeks during the Trojan War. During the fighting, Agamemnon killed Antiphus and fifteen other Trojan soldiers, according to one source. In the Iliad itself, he is shown to slaughter hundreds more in Book Eleven during his aristeia, loosely translated to "day of glory", which is the most similar to Achilles' aristeia in Book Twenty-one. Even before his aristeia, Agamemnon is considered to be one of the three best warriors on the Greek side, as proven when Hector challenges any champion of the Greek side to fight him in Book Seven, and Agamemnon (along with Diomedes and Ajax the Greater) is one of the three Hector most wishes to fight out of the nine strongest Greek warriors who volunteer.

=== End of the war ===
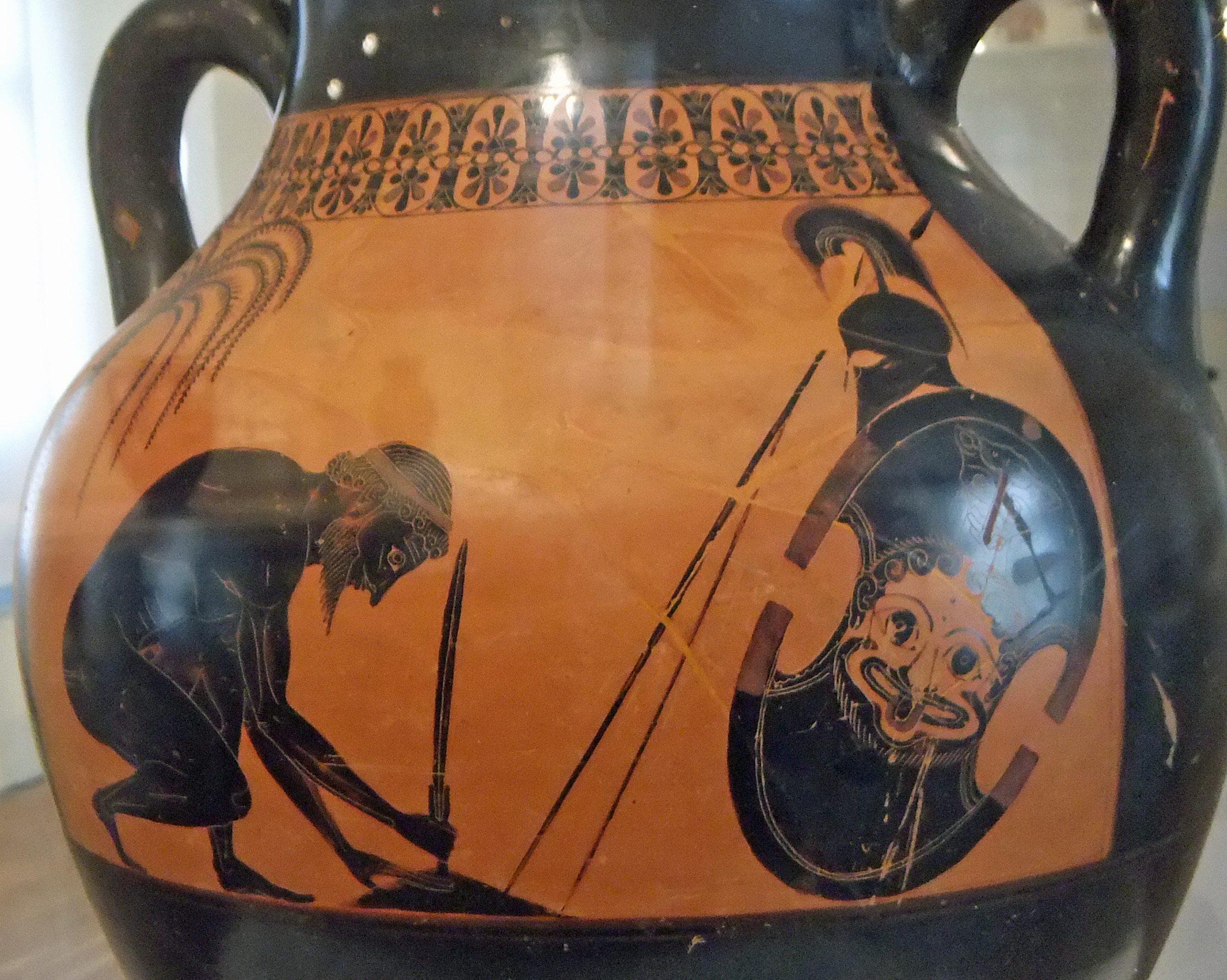
The suicide of Ajax depicted on Greek pottery by Exekias, now on display at the Château-musée de Boulogne-sur-Mer

According to Sophocles' Ajax, after Achilles had fallen in battle, Agamemnon and Menelaus award Achilles' armor to Odysseus. This angers Ajax, who feels he is now the strongest among the Achaean warriors and so deserves the armor. Ajax considers killing them, but is driven to madness by Athena and instead slaughters the herdsmen and cattle that had not yet been divided as spoils of war. He then commits suicide in shame for his actions. As Ajax dies, he curses the sons of Atreus (Agamemnon and Menelaus), along with the entire Achaean army. Agamemnon and Menelaus consider leaving Ajax's body to rot, denying him a proper burial, but are convinced otherwise by Odysseus and Ajax's half-brother Teucer. After the capture of Troy, Cassandra, the doomed prophetess and daughter of Priam, fell to Agamemnon's lot in the distribution of the prizes of war.

== Return to Greece and death ==
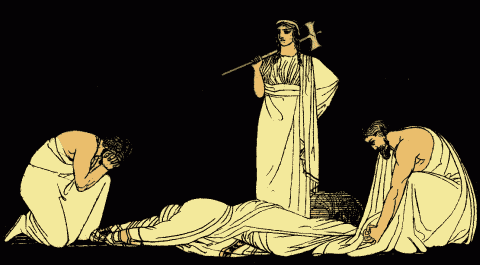
The assassination of Agamemnon, an illustration from Stories from the Greek Tragedians by Alfred Church, 1897

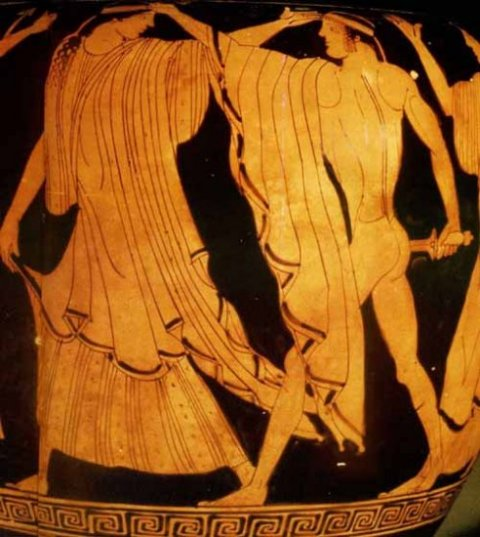
Orestes slaying Clytemnestra

After a stormy voyage, Agamemnon and Cassandra land in Argolis, or, in another version, are blown off course and land in Aegisthus's country. Clytemnestra, Agamemnon's wife, has taken Aegisthus, son of Thyestes, as a lover. When Agamemnon comes home he is slain by Aegisthus (in the oldest versions of the story) or by Clytemnestra. According to the accounts given by Pindar and the tragedians, Agamemnon is slain in a bath by his wife alone, after being ensnared by a blanket or a net thrown over him to prevent resistance. This is the case in Aeschylus' Oresteia.

In Homer's version of the story in the Odyssey, Aegisthus ambushes and kills Agamemnon in a feasting hall under the pretense of holding a feast in honor of Agamemnon's return home from Troy. Clytemnestra also kills Cassandra, and, according to Pausanias, their twin sons Teledamus and Pelops as well. Her motivations are her wrath at the sacrifice of Iphigenia (as in the Oresteia and Iphigenia at Aulis) and her jealousy of Cassandra and other war prizes taken by Agamemnon (as in the Odyssey and works by Ovid).

Aegisthus and Clytemnestra then rule Agamemnon's kingdom for a time, Aegisthus claiming his right of revenge for Atreus's crimes against Thyestes (Thyestes then crying out "thus perish all the race of Pleisthenes!", explaining Aegisthus' action as justified by his father's curse). Agamemnon's son Orestes later avenges his father's murder, with the help or encouragement of his sister Electra, by murdering Aegisthus and Clytemnestra (his own mother), thereby inciting the wrath of the Erinyes (English: the Furies), winged goddesses who track down wrongdoers with their hounds' noses and drive them to insanity.

After death, Agamemnon dwells in the Asphodel Meadows. In the Odyssey, his shade talks with Odysseus during the latter's nekyia, and watches the suitors of Penelope travel down to the underworld. In Book 11, he describes his death and warns Odysseus to be wary of his wife. In Book 24, he commiserates with Achilles, then asks the suitors how they died. Agamemnon praises Penelope for her mind and virtue, cursing his own wife Clytemnestra.

== The curse of the House of Atreus ==
Family Tree of the House of Atreus

Agamemnon's family history is rife with misfortune, born from several curses contributing to the miasma around the family. The curse begins with Agamemnon's great-grandfather Tantalus, who is in Zeus's favor until he tries to feed his son Pelops to the gods in order to test their omniscience, as well as stealing some ambrosia and nectar. Tantalus is then banished to the underworld, where he stands in a pool of water that evaporates every time he reaches down to drink, and above him is a fruit tree whose branches are blown just out of reach by the wind whenever he reaches for the fruit. This begins the cursed house of Atreus, and his descendants would face similar or worse fates.

Later, using his relationship with Poseidon, Pelops convinces the god to grant him a chariot so he may beat Oenomaus, king of Pisa, in a race, and win the hand of his daughter Hippodamia. Myrtilus, who in some accounts helps Pelops win his chariot race, attempts to lie with Pelops's new bride Hippodamia. In anger, Pelops throws Myrtilus off a cliff, but not before Myrtilus curses Pelops and his entire line. Pelops and Hippodamia have many children, including Atreus and Thyestes, who are said to have murdered their half-brother Chrysippus. Pelops banishes Atreus and Thyestes to Mycanae, where Atreus becomes king. Thyestes later conspires with Atreus's wife, Aerope, to supplant Atreus, but they are unsuccessful. Atreus then kills Thyestes' son and cooks him into a meal which Thyestes eats, and afterwards Atreus taunts him with the hands and feet of his now dead son. Thyestes, on the advice of an oracle, then has a son with his own daughter Pelopia. Pelopia tries to expose the infant Aegisthus, but he is found by a shepherd and raised in the house of Atreus. When Aegisthus reaches adulthood Thyestes reveals the truth of his birth, and Aegisthus then kills Atreus.

Atreus and Aerope have three children, Agamemnon, Menelaus, and Anaxibia. The continued miasma surrounding the house of Atreus expresses itself in several events throughout their lives. Agamemnon is forced to sacrifice his own daughter, Iphigenia, to appease the gods and allow the Greek forces to sail for Troy. When Agamemnon refuses to return Chryseis to her father Chryses, he brings plague upon the Greek camp. He is also later killed by his wife, Clytemnestra, who conspires with her new lover Aegisthus in revenge for the death of Iphigenia. Menelaus's wife, Helen of Troy, runs away with Paris, ultimately leading to the Trojan War. According to book 4 of the Odyssey, after the war his fleet is scattered by the gods to Egypt and Crete. When Menelaus finally returns home, his marriage with Helen is now strained and they produce no sons. Both Agamemnon and Menelaus are cursed by Ajax for not granting him Achilles's armor as he commits suicide.

Agamemnon and Clytemnestra have three remaining children, Electra, Orestes, and Chrysothemis. After growing to adulthood and being pressured by Electra, Orestes vows to avenge his father Agamemnon by killing his mother Clytemnestra and Aegisthus. After successfully doing so, he wanders the Greek countryside for many years constantly plagued by the Erinyes (Furies) for his sins. Finally, with the help of Athena and Apollo he is absolved of his crimes, dispersing the miasma, and the curse on house Atreus comes to an end.

== Other stories ==
Athenaeus tells a tale of how Agamemnon mourns the loss of his friend or lover Argynnus, when he drowns in the Cephisus river. He buries him, honored with a tomb and a shrine to Aphrodite Argynnis. This episode is also found in Clement of Alexandria, in Stephen of Byzantium (Kopai and Argunnos), and in Propertius, III with minor variations.

The fortunes of Agamemnon have formed the subject of numerous tragedies, ancient and modern, the most famous being the Oresteia of Aeschylus.

In works of art, there is considerable resemblance between the representations of Zeus, king of the gods, and Agamemnon, king of men. He is generally depicted with a sceptre and diadem, conventional attributes of kings.

Agamemnon's mare is named Aetha. She is also one of two horses driven by Menelaus at the funeral games of Patroclus.

In Homer's Odyssey Agamemnon makes an appearance in the kingdom of Hades after his death. There, the former king meets Odysseus and explains just how he was murdered before he offers Odysseus a warning about the dangers of trusting a woman.

Agamemnon is a character in William Shakespeare's play Troilus and Cressida, set during the Trojan War.

In Frank Herbert's Dune, the House of Atreides trace themselves back to the House of Atreus. At a key point in Children of Dune, Alia Atreides, in a struggle with her ancestral memories, hears Agamemnon shouting "I, your ancestor Agamemnon, demand audience!"

== Worship and related sites ==
In the legends of the Peloponnesus, Agamemnon was regarded as the highest type of a powerful monarch, and in Sparta he was worshipped under the title of Zeus Agamemnon. His tomb was pointed out among the ruins of Mycenae and at Amyclae.

Pausanias records the worship of Agamemnon at Clazomenae.

The famous Baths of Agamemnon near Smyrna were said to have received their name because, according to tradition, many of Agamemnon's soldiers bathed there after an oracle instructed them to do so following a battle, and the waters healed their wounds so effectively that they no longer needed the physician Podalirius.

An archaic proverb, "Agamemnonian wells" (Ἀγαμεμνόνεια φρέατα; "Wells of Agamemnon"), is attested in both ancient and modern Greek, where it denotes remarkable or extraordinary achievements or major public works. According to tradition, Agamemnon ordered wells to be excavated around Aulis and throughout Greece to prevent water shortages during the summer heat.

== In media and art ==
=== Visual arts ===
==== General works ====
- The Mask of Agamemnon, discovered by Heinrich Schliemann in 1876, on display at National Archaeological Museum, Athens
- The Tomb of Agamemnon, by Louis Desprez, 1787, on display at Metropolitan Museum of Art, New York
- Clytemnestra and Agamemnon, by Pierre-Narcisse Guérin, 1817, on display at the Musée des Beaux-Arts d'Orléans
- Electra at the Tomb of Agamemnon, by Frederic Leighton, 1868, on display at Ferens Art Gallery, Kingston upon Hull
- Agamemnon Killing Odios, anonymous, 1545, on display at Metropolitan Museum of Art, New York

==== With Iphigenia ====
- Sacrifice of Iphigenia, by Arnold Houbraken, 1690–1700, on display at the Rijksmuseum, Amsterdam
- The Sacrifice of Iphigenia, by Charles de La Fosse, 1680, on display at the Palace of Versailles
- The Sacrifice of Iphigenia, by Gaetano Gandolfi, 1789, on display at Metropolitan Museum of Art, New York
- Sacrificio di Ifigenia, by Pietro Testa, 1640
- The Sacrifice of Iphigenia, by Giovanni Battista Tiepolo, 1757, on display at the Villa Varmarana, Vicenza
- Sacrifice of Iphigenia, by Jan Steen, 1671, on display at the Leiden Collection, New York
- The Sacrifice of Iphigenia, by Sebastian Bourdon, 1653, on display at the Musée des Beaux-Arts d'Orléans

==== With Achilles ====
- The Quarrel Between Agamemnon and Achilles , by Giovanni Battista Gaulli, 1695, on display at the Musée départemental de l'Oise, Beauvais
- The Anger of Achilles, by Jacques-Louis David, 1819, on display at Kimbell Art Museum, Fort Worth
- The Wrath of Achilles, by Michel Martin Drolling, 1810, on display at the École des Beaux-Arts, Paris
- Quarrel of Achilles and Agamemnon, by William Page, on display at the Smithsonian American Art Museum, Washington, D.C.
Agamemnon in art
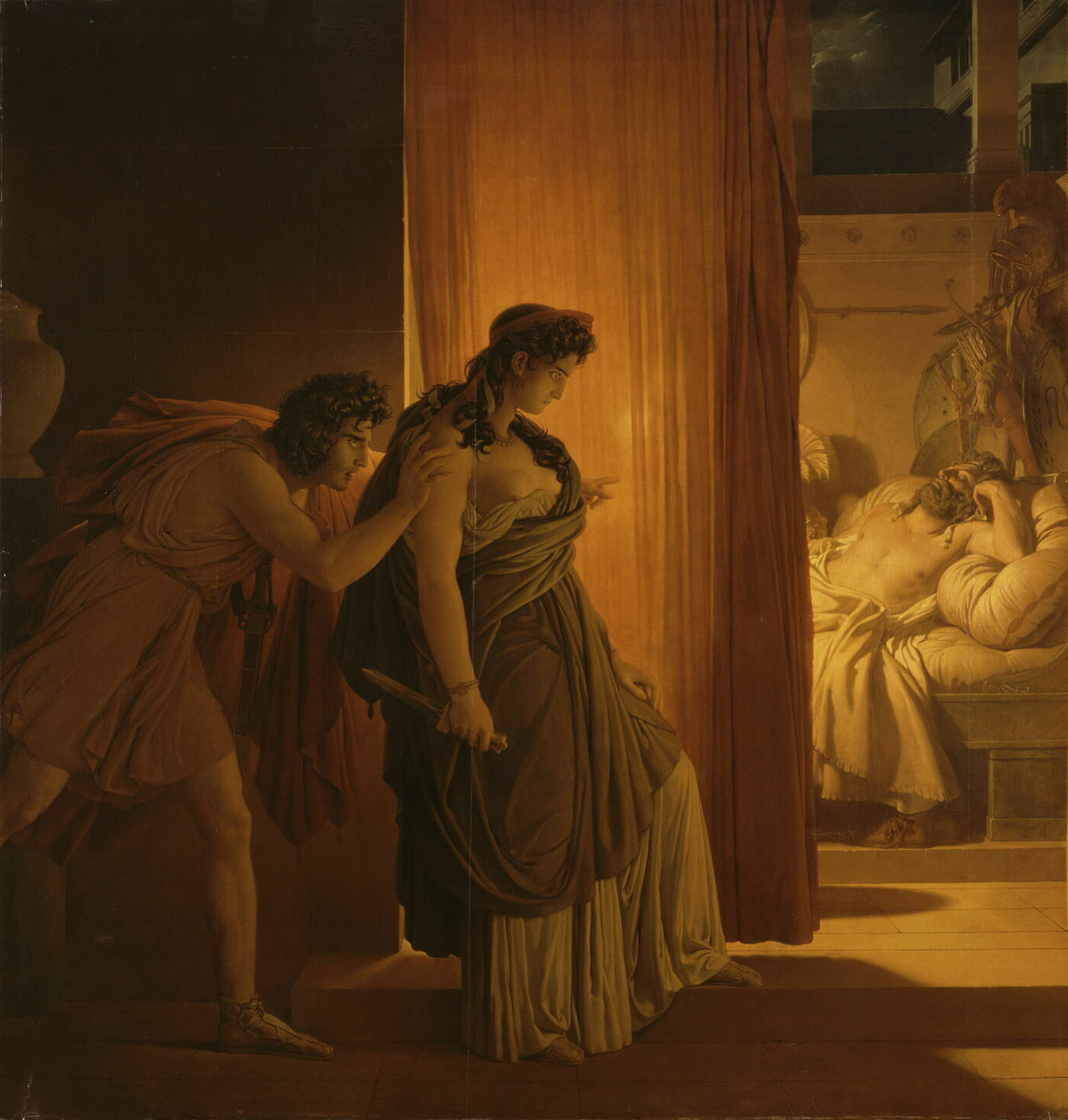
Clytemnestra and Agamemnon by Pierre-Narcisse Guérin

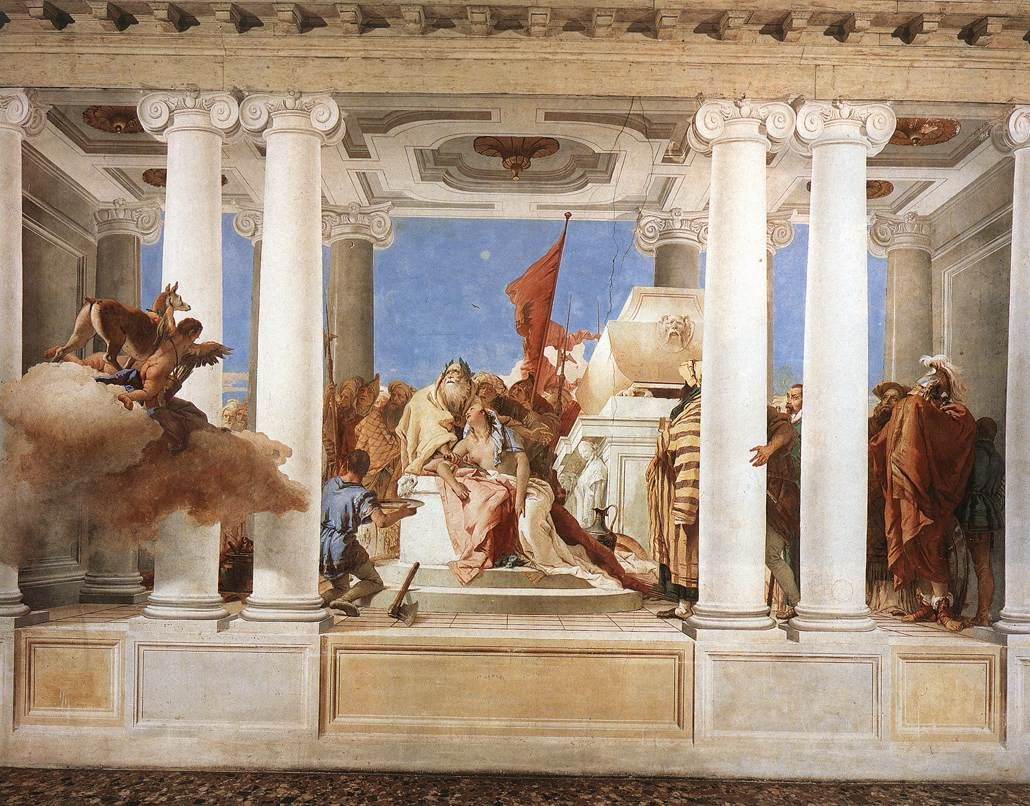
The Sacrifice of Iphigenia by Giovanni Battista Tiepolo

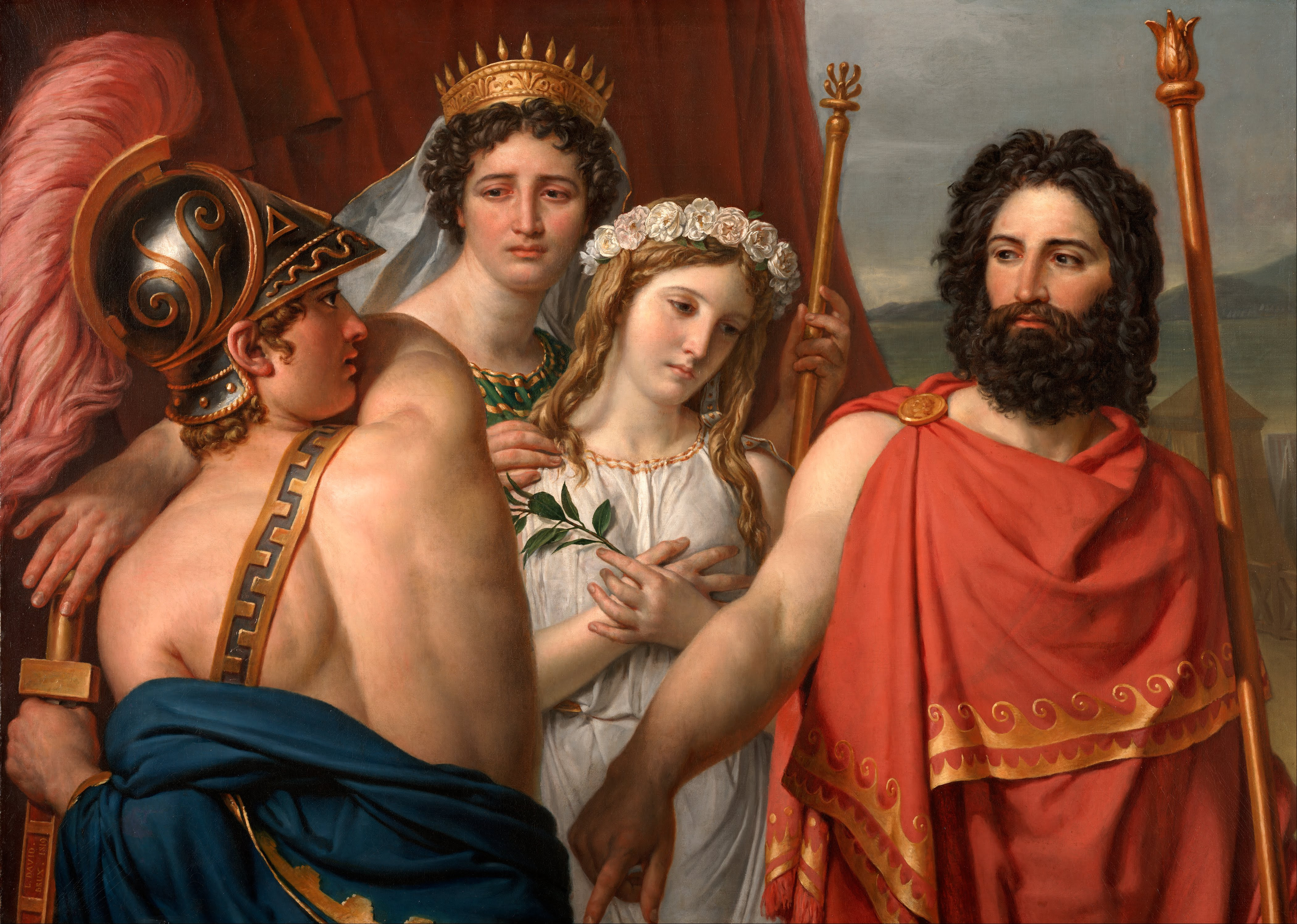
The Anger of Achilles by Jacques-Louis David

== See also ==
- HMS Agamemnon
- National Archaeological Museum of Athens

== Bibliography ==
- Aeschylus, Agamemnon in Aeschylus, with an English translation by Herbert Weir Smyth, Ph. D. in two volumes, Vol. 2, Cambridge, Massachusetts, Harvard University Press, 1926, Online version at the Perseus Digital Library.
- Apollodorus, Apollodorus, The Library, with an English Translation by Sir James George Frazer, F.B.A., F.R.S. in 2 Volumes, Cambridge, Massachusetts, Harvard University Press; London, William Heinemann, 1921, Online version at the Perseus Digital Library.
- Athenaeus, The Learned Banqueters, Volume VI: Books 12-13.594b, edited and translated by S. Douglas Olson, Loeb Classical Library, No. 345, Cambridge, Massachusetts, Harvard University Press, 2011 ISBN 978-0-674-99673-1, Online version at Harvard University Press.
- Collard, Christopher and Martin Cropp (2008a), Euripides Fragments: Aegeus–Meleanger, Loeb Classical Library, No. 504, Cambridge, Massachusetts, Harvard University Press, 2008 ISBN 978-0-674-99625-0, Online version at Harvard University Press.
- Collard, Christopher and Martin Cropp (2008b), Euripides Fragments: Oedipus-Chrysippus: Other Fragments, Loeb Classical Library No. 506, Cambridge, Massachusetts, Harvard University Press, 2008 ISBN 978-0-674-99631-1, Online version at Harvard University Press.
- Dictys Cretensis, The Trojan War - The Chronicles of Dictys of Crete and Dares the Phrygian, translated by R. M. Frazer (Jr.), Indiana University Press, 1966.
- Euripides, Helen, translated by E. P. Coleridge in The Complete Greek Drama, edited by Whitney J. Oates and Eugene O'Neill Jr, Volume 2, New York, Random House, 1938, Online version at the Perseus Digital Library.
- Euripides, Iphigenia in Tauris, translated by Robert Potter in The Complete Greek Drama, edited by Whitney J. Oates and Eugene O'Neill Jr, Volume 2, New York, Random House, 1938, Online version at the Perseus Digital Library.
- Euripides, Orestes, translated by E. P. Coleridge in The Complete Greek Drama, edited by Whitney J. Oates and Eugene O'Neill Jr, Volume 1, New York, Random House, 1938, Online version at the Perseus Digital Library.
- Timothy Gantz, Early Greek Myth: A Guide to Literary and Artistic Sources, Johns Hopkins University Press, 1996, Two volumes: ISBN 978-0-8018-5360-9 (Vol. 1), ISBN 978-0-8018-5362-3 (Vol. 2).
- Grimal, Pierre; The Dictionary of Classical Mythology, Wiley-Blackwell, 1996 ISBN 978-0-631-20102-1.
- Hard, Robin, The Routledge Handbook of Greek Mythology: Based on H.J. Rose's "Handbook of Greek Mythology", Psychology Press, 2004 ISBN 9780415186360, Google Books.
- Homer, The Iliad with an English Translation by A.T. Murray, Ph.D. in two volumes, Cambridge, MA, Harvard University Press; London, William Heinemann, 1924, Online version at the Perseus Digital Library.
- Homer, The Odyssey with an English Translation by A.T. Murray, PH.D. in two volumes, Cambridge, MA, Harvard University Press, London, William Heinemann, 1919, Online version at the Perseus Digital Library.
- Gaius Julius Hyginus, Fabulae, in The Myths of Hyginus, edited and translated by Mary A. Grant, Lawrence, University Press of Kansas, 1960, Online version at ToposText.
- Glenn W. Most, Hesiod: The Shield, Catalogue of Women, Other Fragments, Loeb Classical Library, No. 503, Cambridge, Massachusetts, Harvard University Press, 2007, 2018 ISBN 978-0-674-99721-9, Online version at Harvard University Press.
- Parada, Carlos, Genealogical Guide to Greek Mythology, Jonsered, Paul Åströms Förlag, 1993 ISBN 978-91-7081-062-6.
- Pausanias, Pausanias Description of Greece with an English Translation by W.H.S. Jones, Litt.D., and H.A. Ormerod, M.A., in 4 Volumes, Cambridge, Massachusetts, Harvard University Press; London, William Heinemann, 1918, Online version at the Perseus Digital Library.
- Sophocles, The Ajax of Sophocles - Edited with introduction and notes by Sir Richard Jebb, Sir Richard Jebb, Cambridge, Cambridge University Press, 1893, Online version at the Perseus Digital Library.
- This article incorporates text from a publication now in the public domain: Chisholm, Hugh, ed. (1911). "Agamemnon". Encyclopædia Britannica. Vol. 1 (11th ed.). Cambridge University Press. pp. 363–364.

=== Primary sources ===
- Homer, Iliad
- Euripides, Electra
- Sophocles, Electra
- Seneca, Agamemnon
- Aeschylus, The Libation Bearers
- Homer, Odyssey I, 28–31; XI, 385–464
- Aeschylus, Agamemnon
- Apollodorus, Epitome, II, 15 – III, 22; VI, 23
