= Bajulata =

Scientific classification
- Kingdom: Animalia
- Phylum: Arthropoda
- Clade: Pancrustacea
- Class: Insecta
- Order: Hemiptera
- Suborder: Auchenorrhyncha
- Family: Membracidae
- Subfamily: Smiliinae
- Tribe: Amastrini
- Genus: Bajulata; Ball, 1933
- Species: B. bajuIa

Binomial name
- Bajulata bajuIa Goding, 1894

Genus of insects

Bajiilata is a genus of treehoppers belonging to the tribe Amastrlni in the subfamily Smillinae. It is monotypic, being represented by the single species, Bajulata bajuIa.
