= Apemosyne =

Cretan princess

In Greek mythology, Apemosyne (Ancient Greek: Ἀπημοσύνη, romanized: Apēmosúnē) was a Cretan princess as the daughter of King Catreus of Crete, the son of Minos. She had a brother Althaemenes, and two sisters, Aerope and Clymene.

== Mythology ==
Apemosyne was mentioned in the account of Apollodorus. According to Apollodorus, Catreus received an oracle saying that he would be killed by one of his children, and although Catreus hid the oracles, his son Althaemenes found out. Fearing that he would be the one to kill Catreus, Althaemenes took Apemosyne and fled with her to Rhodes.

There, Hermes fell in love with Apemosyne, but Apemosyne fled from him. Hermes could not catch her, because she ran faster than him. On her way back from a spring, Apemosyne slipped on freshly skinned hides that Hermes had laid across her path. Hermes then caught and raped her. Later, when Apemosyne told her brother what had happened, he became angry, thinking that she was lying about being molested by the god. In his anger, he kicked her to death.

== Interpretation ==
Arthur Bernard Cook, saw in the myth of Apemosyne an historical element reflecting the relationship between Minoan Crete and Rhodes, as well as a possible etiological aspect explaining an ancient Rhodian custom involving human sacrifice.

== See also ==
- Io
- Aerope
- Pasiphaë
