= Agamemnon (Zeus) =

Ancient Greek cultic epithet

Agamemnon or Zeus Agamemnon (Gr. Ἀγαμέμνων) was a cultic epithet of the Greek god Zeus, under which he was worshiped at Sparta. Some writers, such as Eustathius, thought that the god derived this name from the resemblance between him and the Greek hero Agamemnon; others that Zeus Agamemnon was merely a synecdoche glorifying the hero, not the god. Still others believed it to be a mere epithet signifying the eternal, from agan (ἀγὰν) and menon (μένων).
