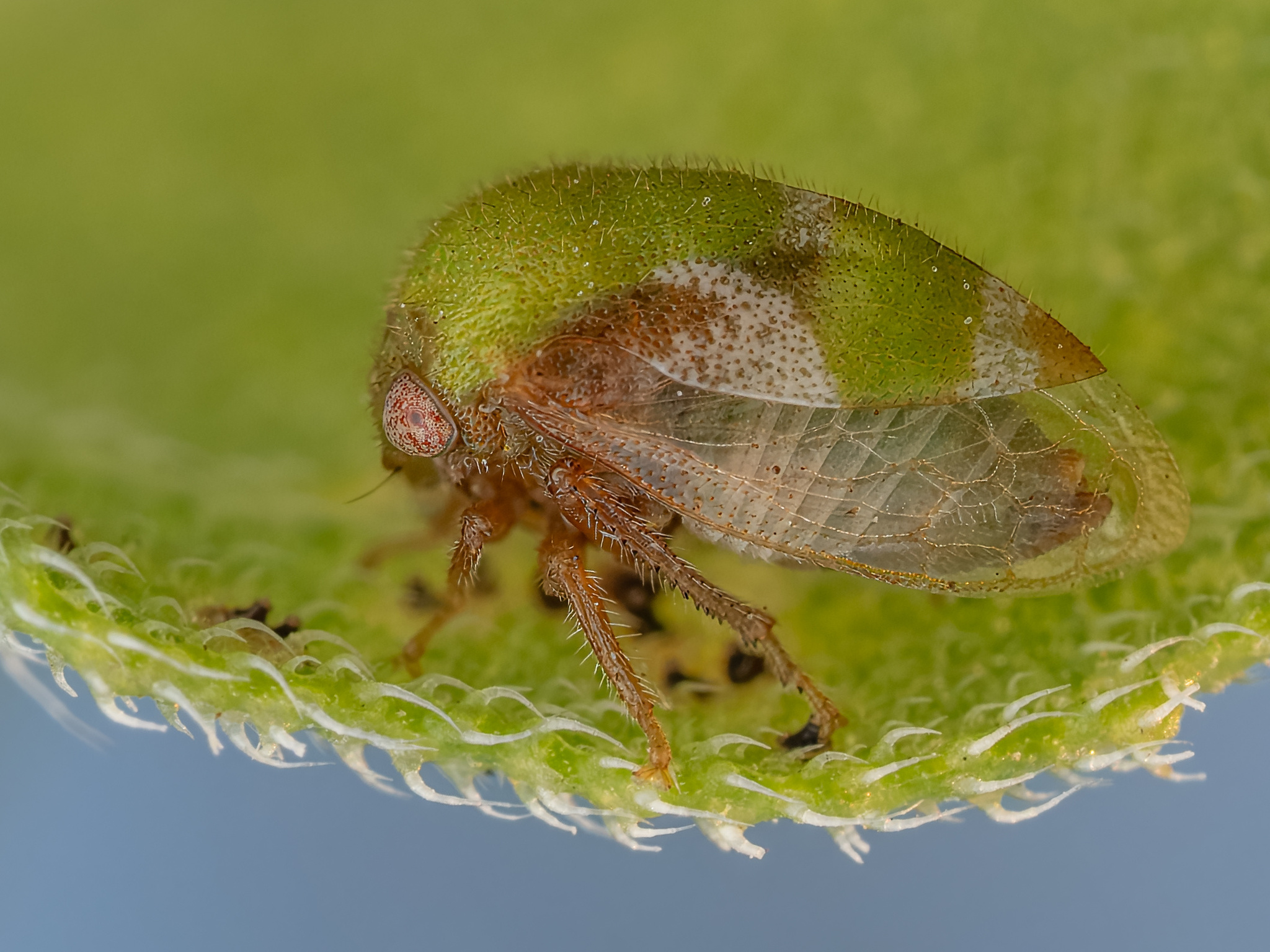

Scientific classification
- Kingdom: Animalia
- Phylum: Arthropoda
- Class: Insecta
- Order: Hemiptera
- Suborder: Auchenorrhyncha
- Family: Membracidae
- Genus: Vanduzea
- Species: V. segmentata

Binomial name
- Vanduzea segmentata Fowler, 1895

= Vanduzea segmentata =

Species of insect

Vanduzea segmentata is a species of treehopper belonging to the genus Vanduzea. It was first described by the British entomologist William Weekes Fowler in 1895, as Hypamastris segmentata.

== Appearance ==
Vanduzea segmentata is quite small, with males being 3–4 millimetres long and females being 4–5 millimetres long. Their pronotum is low and rounded. Females are typically more green than males. Nymphs are brown-coloured.

== Habitat ==
Vanduzea segmentata is found across the southern United States, Mexico, Central America, and northern South America. It is also found in Hawaii. This is most likely due to certain insects and plants helping spread the species' range.

== Food ==
Due to its wide range, V. segmentata feeds on multiple types of trees and plants, such as:

- Albizia julibrissin
- Ambrosia artemisiifolia
- Bidens alba
- Datura stramonium
- Heterotheca subaxillaris
- Melilotus alba
