= Pelops (son of Agamemnon) =

Son of Agamemnon and Cassandra

In Greek mythology, Pelops (/ˈpiːlɒps, ˈpɛlɒps/; Greek: Πέλοψ "dark eyes" or "dark face", derived from pelios 'dark' and ops 'face, eye') was a son of Agamemnon and Cassandra. This Pelops, carrying the ancestral name (after his great-grandfather Pelops, king of Pisa) and his twin brother Teledamus (destined to have been "far-ruling"), the very emblems of the Pelopides, were murdered in their infancy by the usurper Aegisthus.
