= Tynelia =

Scientific classification
- Kingdom: Animalia
- Phylum: Arthropoda
- Clade: Pancrustacea
- Class: Insecta
- Order: Hemiptera
- Suborder: Auchenorrhyncha
- Family: Membracidae
- Subfamily: Smiliinae
- Tribe: Amastrini
- Genus: Tynelia; Stål, 1858

Genus of insects

Tynelia is a genus of treehopper belonging to the family Membracidae. It has 10 described species.

== Species ==
Catalogue of Life lists the following:

- Tynelia cerulea
- Tynelia cinctata
- Tynelia flavodorsata
- Tynelia globosa
- Tynelia hirsuta
- Tynelia longula
- Tynelia nigra
- Tynelia nitida
- Tynelia prominens
- Tynelia pubescens
