= Alcmaon =

Mythological Greek warrior

In Greek mythology, Alcmaon (Ancient Greek: Ἀλκμάονα, romanized: Alkmáōn) was the son of Thestor. He was one of the Achaean warriors who fought at Troy but was killed by the Lycian leader Sarpedon with a spear.
