= Theonoe of Mycenae =

In Greek mythology, Theonoe (Ancient Greek: Θεονόη) was the Mycenaean daughter of the prophet Thestor and possibly Polymele, sister to Theoclymenus, Calchas, Leucippe. Her name means "divine wisdom" coming from theós 'god' and nóos or noûs 'mind'.

== Mythology ==
When Theonoe was playing outside, she was kidnapped by pirates who took her to Caria on their ship, where King Icarus bought her for a concubine. Thestor, however, went in search of his lost daughter, and as a result of shipwreck, came to the land of Caria, and was seized and beaten in chains at the place where Theonoe was staying.

Years later, Leucippe who lost her father and sister, asked Delphi whether she should search for them. Then Apollo replied: "Go throughout the earth as my priest, and you will find them". Leucippe, on hearing this response, cut her hair and disguised herself as a youthful priest, she went from country to country to find them. When she had come to Caria, Theonoe saw her, and thinking she was a priest, fell in love with 'him', and bade 'him' be brought to her bedroom so that she could lie with 'him'. But Leucippe revealing herself to be a woman, said it could not be done. Then Theonoe in anger gave orders that the priest be locked in a room and that someone from the servants' quarters come to kill him.

The old man Thestor was sent unknowingly to his daughter to perform the task. Because so many years had passed, the two did not recognize each other and Theonoe gave her father a sword, setting him out to kill the priest. When he had entered, with the sword in hand, he told Leucippe that his name was Thestor who had lost his two daughters (Leucippe and Theonoe) and had come to this pitch of misfortune that he had been ordered to commit a crime.

When he had turned the weapon and was about to commit suicide, Leucippe, hearing her father's name, wrested the sword from him. In order to go and kill the queen, she called on her father Thestor to aid her. When the two arrive at Theonoe, hearing her father's name, gave proof that she was his daughter. Then Icarus the king, after this recognition, sent them back into their country with gifts.
