= Idioderma =

Scientific classification
- Kingdom: Animalia
- Phylum: Arthropoda
- Class: Insecta
- Order: Hemiptera
- Suborder: Auchenorrhyncha
- Family: Membracidae
- Tribe: Amastrini
- Genus: Idioderma; Van Duzee, 1909

Genus of insects

Idioderma is a genus of treehoppers belonging to the tribe Amastrini.

== Species ==
There are two species recognised in the genus Idioderma:

- Idioderma picta Osborn
- Idioderma virescens Van Duzee
