= Idioderma virescens =

Scientific classification
- Domain: Eukaryota
- Kingdom: Animalia
- Phylum: Arthropoda
- Class: Insecta
- Order: Hemiptera
- Suborder: Auchenorrhyncha
- Family: Membracidae
- Genus: Idioderma
- Species: I. virescens

Binomial name
- Idioderma virescens Van Duzee, 1909

Species of insect

Idioderma virescens is a species of treehopper belonging to the family Membracidae.
