= Calchas =

Seer in Greek mythology

Calchas Thestorides Κάλχας Θεστορίδης
- Trojan War character
- Calchas (or Agamemnon) presides at the sacrifice of Iphigenia, the daughter of Agamemnon, as the divine price of the winds required to carry the fleet to Troy, in a peristyle fresco from Pompeii.
- First appearance: "Iliad"; Epic poetry
- Created by: Homer and his school
- Based on: Character from a traditional story of the Trojan War
- Adapted by: Greek oral poets presenting the story in poetry contests at festivals

In-universe information
- Title: Guide
- Occupation: Seer, Greek Mantis, in the sense of one who knows the divine will.
- Affiliation: Achaean army
- Origin: Argos in the Peloponnesus
- Nationality: Achaean

Calchas (/ˈkælkəs/; Ancient Greek: Κάλχας, romanized: Kálkhas) is an Argive mantis, or seer, in Greek mythology. Calchas appears in the opening scenes of the Iliad and also has a long literary history after Homer.

A seer in the service of the Greek forces, Calchas is portrayed as a skilled augur, Greek oionopólos ('bird-savant'): "as an augur, Calchas had no rival in the camp." He had received knowledge of the past, present and future from the god Apollo. He had other mantic skills as well: interpreting the entrails of the enemy during the tide of battle. His mantosune, as it is called in the Iliad, is the hereditary occupation of his family, which accounts for the most credible etymology of his name: “the dark one” in the sense of ‘ponderer’, based on the resemblance of pondering to melancholy, or being ‘blue’.

== Description ==
Calchas was described by the chronicler Malalas in his account of the Chronography as "short, white, all grey, including the beard, hairy, a very fine seer and omen-reader".

== Family ==
Calchas was the son of Polymele and Thestor; grandson of the seer Idmon; and brother of Leucippe, Theonoe, and Theoclymenus.

== Career ==
It was Calchas who prophesied that in order to gain a favourable wind to deploy the Greek ships mustered in Aulis on their way to Troy Agamemnon would need to sacrifice his daughter, Iphigenia, to appease Artemis, whom Agamemnon had offended. The episode was related at length in the lost Cypria of the Epic Cycle. He also states that Troy will be sacked on the tenth year of the war.

In Sophocles' Ajax Calchas delivers a prophecy to Teucer suggesting that the protagonist will die if he leaves his tent before the day is out.

=== Iliad ===
In the Iliad Calchas' most powerful critic is Agamemnon himself. Agamemnon is critical of Calchas in the Iliad for unknown reasons. The sacrifice of Iphigenia is not explicitly mentioned but readers of Book 1 may have been aware of it. At the beginning of the Iliad Calchas delivers another blow to him.

In open assembly Calchas prophesies that the captive Chryseis, a spoil of war awarded to Agamemnon, must be returned to her father, Chryses, in order to propitiate Apollo into lifting the plague he has sent as punishment for Agamemnon's disrespect of Chryses, Apollo's priest. Agamemnon explodes in anger and calls the prophet a "visionary of hell" (Fitzgerald translation) and accuses Calchas of rendering unfair prophecies. Fearing Agamemnon, Calchas first secures a champion in Achilles, who speaks against Agamemnon in heated terms in assembly. Agamemnon grudgingly accepts the edict of Apollo (supported by the Assembly) that he give up his prize but as an insult to Achilles threatens to take Achilles’ own prize, Briseis, as recompense, resulting in the quarrel between Achilles and Agamemnon, the main plot of the epic poem (Iliad. 1.60-154).

Later in the story Poseidon assumes the form of Calchas in order to rouse and empower the Greek forces while Zeus is not observing the battle.

=== Posthomerica ===
Calchas also plays a role in Quintus of Smyrna's Posthomerica. Calchas says that if they are brief they can persuade Achilles to fight. It is he rather than Helenus (as suggested in Sophocles' Philoctetes) who predicts that Troy will fall only once the Argives are able to recruit Philoctetes. It is on his advice that they halt the battle, even though Neoptolemus is slaughtering the Trojans. He also tells the Argives that the city will be more easily taken by strategy than by force. He endorses Odysseus' suggestion that the Trojan Horse will effectively infiltrate the Trojans. He also foresees that Aeneas will survive the battle and found a city and tells the Argives that they will not kill him. He does not join the Argives when they board the ships since he foresaw the impending doom of the Kapherean Rocks.

In medieval and later versions of the myth Calchas is portrayed as a Trojan defector and the father of Chryseis, now called Cressida.

Calchas is a character in William Shakespeare's play Troilus and Cressida.

== Death ==
Calchas died of shame at Colophon in Asia Minor shortly after the Trojan War (as told in the Cyclic Nostoi and Melampodia): the prophet Mopsus beat him in a contest of soothsaying, although Strabo placed an oracle of Calchas on Monte Gargano in Magna Graecia.

It is also said that Calchas died of laughter when he thought another seer had incorrectly predicted his death. This seer had foretold Calchas would never drink from the wine produced from vines he had planted himself; Calchas made the wine but, holding the cup, he died of laughter before he could inform them they had drunk it the previous night.
