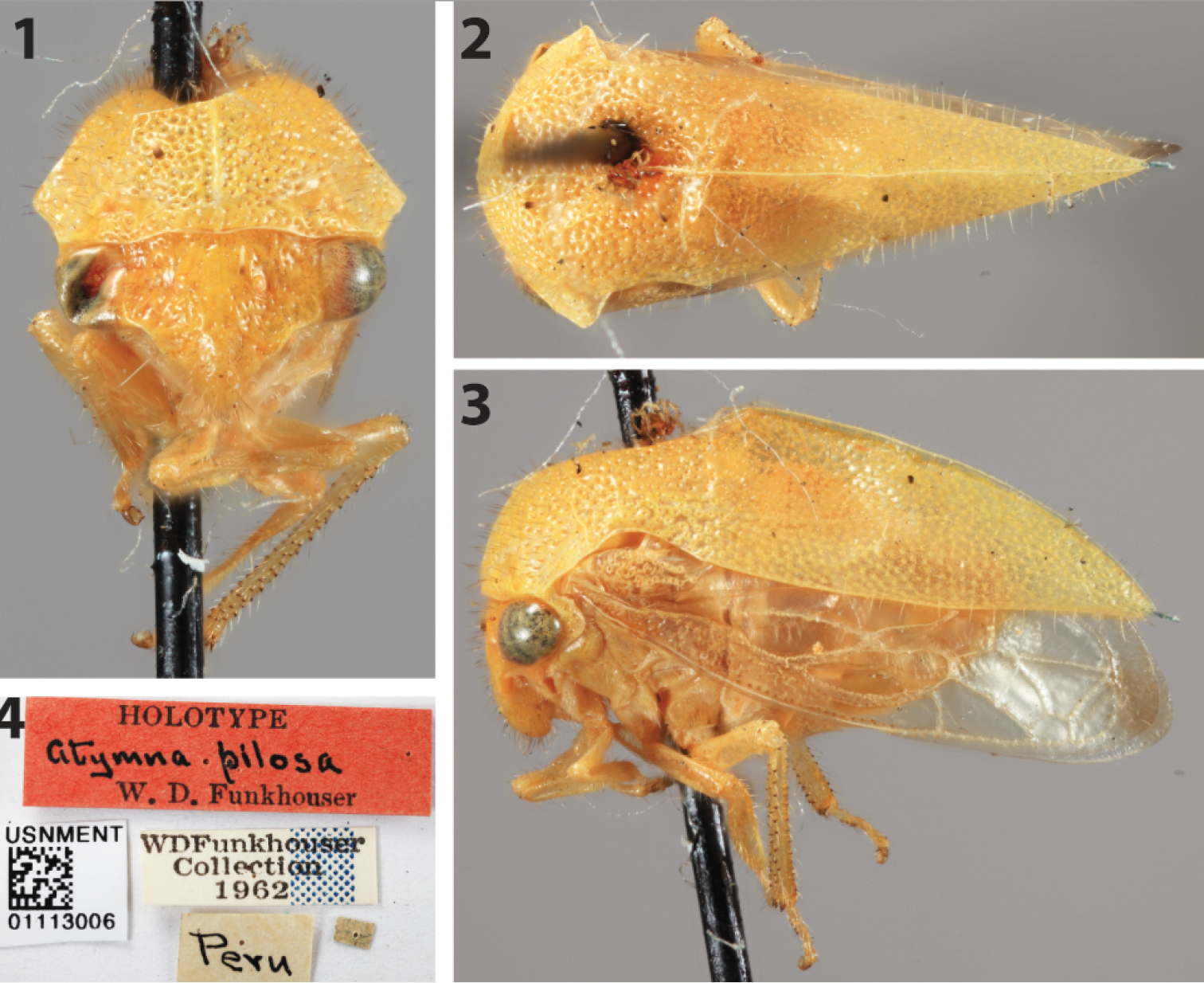

Scientific classification
- Domain: Eukaryota
- Kingdom: Animalia
- Phylum: Arthropoda
- Class: Insecta
- Order: Hemiptera
- Suborder: Auchenorrhyncha
- Family: Membracidae
- Tribe: Amastrini
- Genus: Amastris; Stål, 1862

= Amastris (treehopper) =

Genus of treehoppers

Amastris is a genus of treehoppers belonging to the family Membracidae. It has 71 described species.

== Species ==
GBIF lists the following species:

- Amastris affinis Broomfield, 1976
- Amastris alapigmentata Broomfield, 1976
- Amastris angulata Broomfield, 1976
- Amastris antica Germar
- Amastris arquata Broomfield, 1976
- Amastris brunneipennis Funkhouser
- Amastris citrina Fairmaire
- Amastris compacta Walker
- Amastris concolor Broomfield, 1976
- Amastris consanguinea Stảl
- Amastris conspicua Broomfield, 1976
- Amastris dama Broomfield, 1976
- Amastris deitzi Creão-Duarte & Sakakibara, 1994
- Amastris deplumis Broomfield, 1976
- Amastris depressa Broomfield, 1976
- Amastris discreta Broomfield, 1976
- Amastris affinis Broomfield, 1976
- Amastris alapigmentata Broomfield, 1976
- Amastris angulata Broomfield, 1976
- Amastris antica Germar
- Amastris arquata Broomfield, 1976
- Amastris brunneipennis Funkhouser
- Amastris citrina Fairmaire
- Amastris compacta Walker
- Amastris concolor Broomfield, 1976
- Amastris consanguinea Stảl
- Amastris conspicua Broomfield, 1976
- Amastris dama Broomfield, 1976
- Amastris deitzi Creão-Duarte & Sakakibara, 1994
- Amastris deplumis Broomfield, 1976
- Amastris depressa Broomfield, 1976
- Amastris discreta Broomfield, 1976
- Amastris discreta Broomfield, 1976
- Amastris dissimilis Broomfield, 1976
- Amastris elevata Funkhouser
- Amastris evexa Broomfield, 1976
- Amastris exaltata Walker
- Amastris exigua Broomfield, 1976
- Amastris fallax Stảl
- Amastris fasciata Broomfield, 1976
- Amastris finitima Broomfield, 1976
- Amastris flava Broomfield, 1976
- Amastris flavifolia Funkhouser
- Amastris fonsecai Broomfield, 1976
- Amastris froeschneri Broomfield, 1976
- Amastris funkhouseri Haviland
- Amastris gregaria Broomfield, 1976
- Amastris guttata Fonseca
- Amastris inclinata Broomfield, 1976
- Amastris inconspicua Broomfield, 1976
- Amastris inermis Broomfield, 1976
- Amastris inornata Broomfield, 1976
- Amastris interstincta Broomfield, 1976
- Amastris janae Broomfield, 1976
- Amastris knighti Broomfield, 1976
- Amastris lycioda Ball
- Amastris maculata Funkhouser
- Amastris melina Broomfield, 1976
- Amastris minuta Funkhouser
- Amastris notata Broomfield, 1976
- Amastris obscura Broomfield, 1976
- Amastris obtegens Fabricius
- Amastris panamensis Broomfield, 1976
- Amastris peruviana Funkhouser
- Amastris pilosa (Funkhouser)
- Amastris projecta Funkhouser
- Amastris pseudoelevata Broomfield, 1976
- Amastris pseudomaculata Broomfield, 1976
- Amastris punctata Broomfield, 1976
- Amastris ramosa Broomfield, 1976
- Amastris reclusa Broomfield, 1976
- Amastris revelata Broomfield, 1976
- Amastris robusta Broomfield, 1976
- Amastris sabulosa Funkhouser
- Amastris sakakibarai Broomfield, 1976
- Amastris simillima Stảl
- Amastris singularis Broomfield, 1976
- Amastris specialis Broomfield, 1976
- Amastris straminea Broomfield, 1976
- Amastris subangulata Broomfield, 1976
- Amastris sulphurea Broomfield, 1976
- Amastris templa Ball
- Amastris triviale Broomfield, 1976
- Amastris undulata Broomfield, 1976
- Amastris unica Broomfield, 1976
- Amastris vicina Broomfield, 1976
- Amastris viridisparsa Broomfield, 1976
- Amastris vismiae Haviland
- Amastris vitallina Broomfield, 1976
