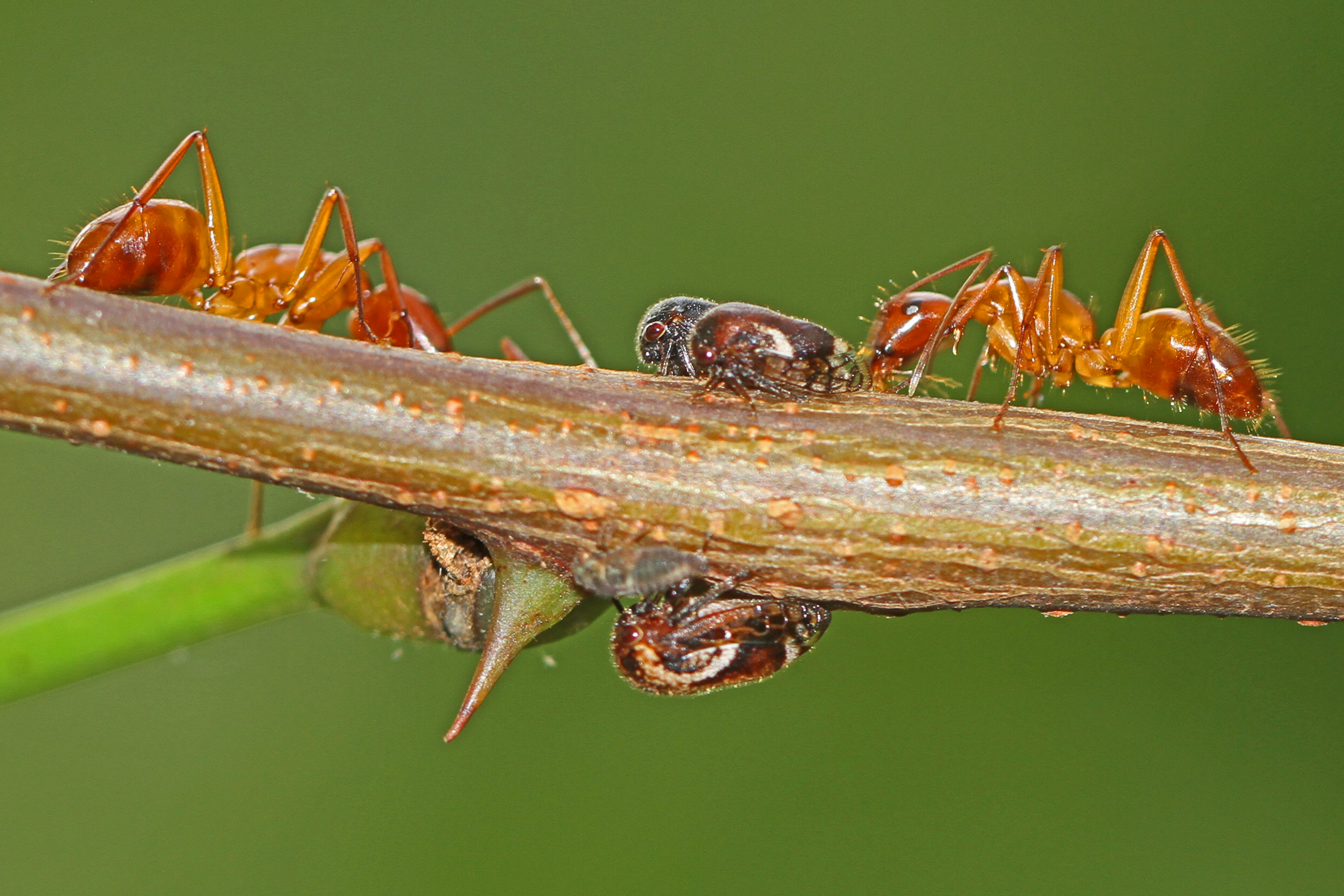

Scientific classification
- Domain: Eukaryota
- Kingdom: Animalia
- Phylum: Arthropoda
- Class: Insecta
- Order: Hemiptera
- Suborder: Auchenorrhyncha
- Family: Membracidae
- Genus: Vanduzea
- Species: V. arquata

Binomial name
- Vanduzea arquata Say

= Vanduzea arquata =

Species of true bug

Vanduzea arquata, the black locust treehopper, is a species of treehopper in the family Membracidae. It is found in North America. Females lay their eggs in the buds of black locust trees. These membracids are attended to by ants, such as Formica subsericea.

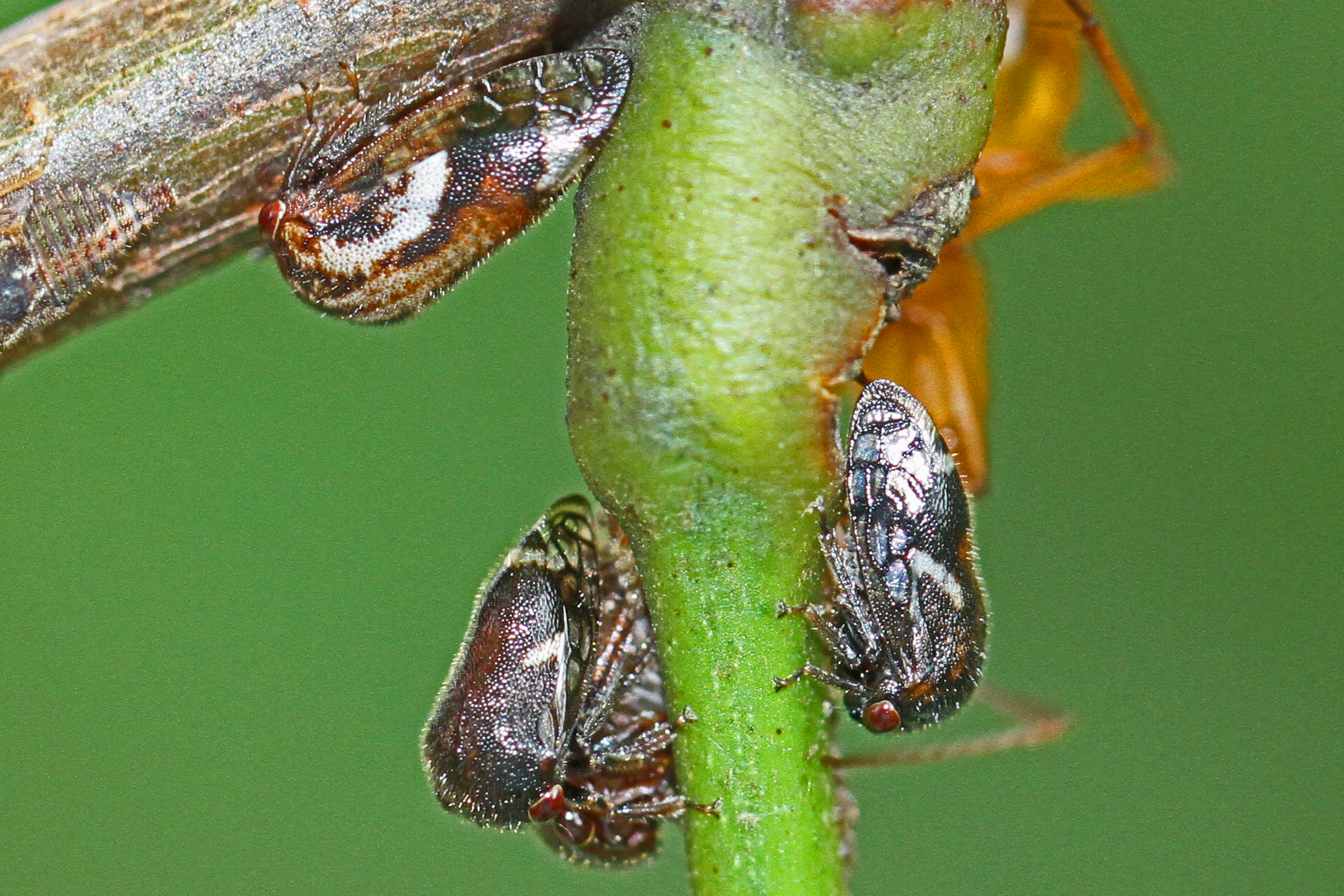
Black locust treehopper, Vanduzea arquata

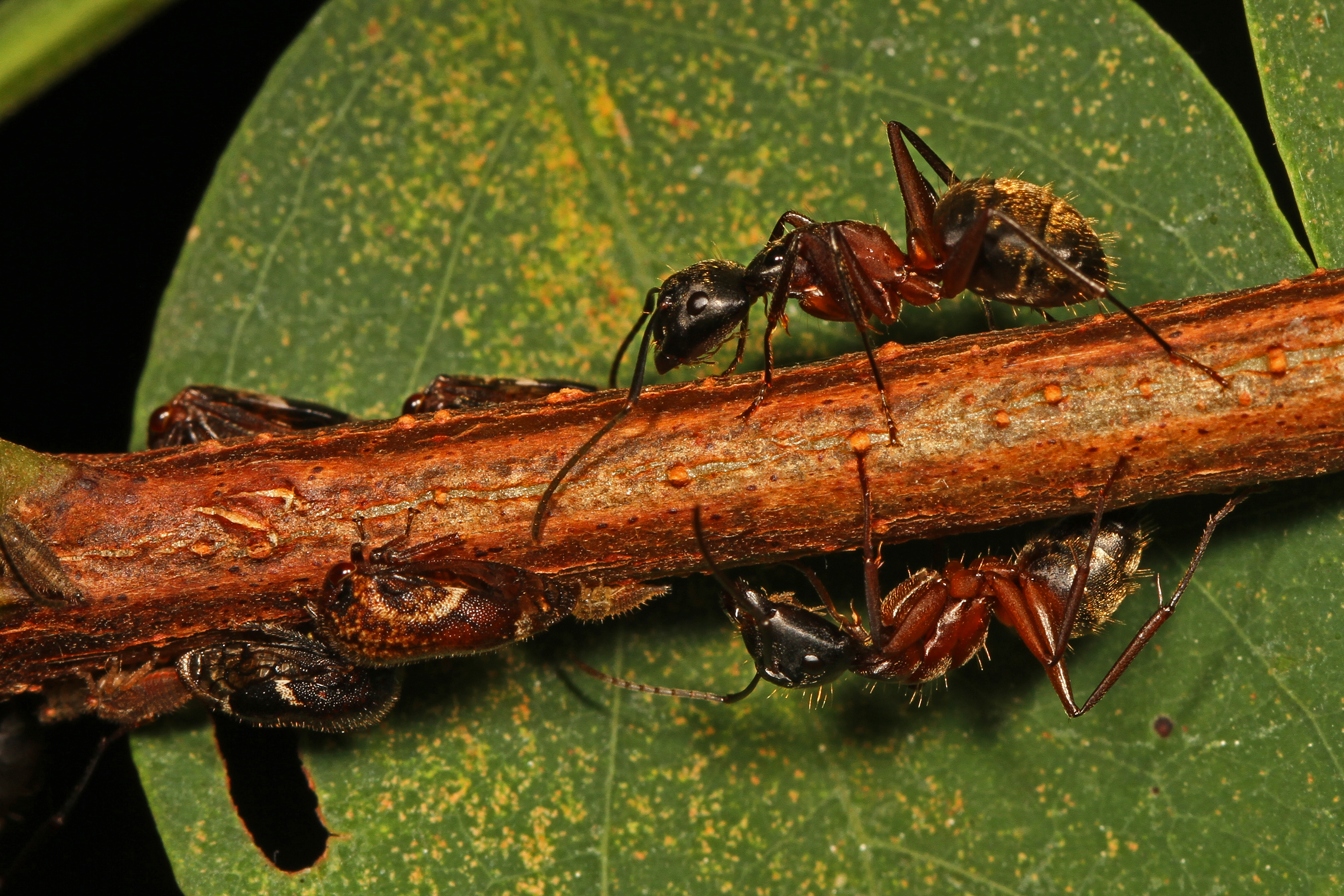
Black locust treehopper, Vanduzea arquata
