= Tantalus (son of Thyestes) =

Mythological Greek character

In Greek mythology, Tantalus (Ancient Greek: Τάνταλος, romanized: Tántalos) was a prince of the south of Argolis as son of King Thyestes. He was the brother of Pleisthenes, Pelopia and Aegisthus, and - according to Hyginus - also of Menelaus and Agamemnon.

According to Hyginus, Tantalus and Pleisthenes were born to Thyestes and Aerope, wife of his brother Atreus. In revenge for his wife and brother's betrayal, Atreus famously killed and fed both Tantalus and Pleisthenes to their father. The 2nd-century AD travel writer Pausanias describes them as the son of either Thyestes or Broteas (who is typically Tantalus's son).

According to Tzetzes and Apollodorus, Tantalus lived to adulthood and became the first husband of the Spartan princess Clytemnestra. He was slain together with their newborn child by Agamemnon who married Clytemnestra after Tantalus' death, against her will.

== See also ==
- Aegisthus
- Orestes
