= Hygris =

Scientific classification
- Kingdom: Animalia
- Phylum: Arthropoda
- Clade: Pancrustacea
- Class: Insecta
- Order: Hemiptera
- Suborder: Auchenorrhyncha
- Family: Membracidae
- Genus: Hygris; Stål, 1862

Species
- Hygris beckeri; Hygris unicarinata

Genus of insect

Hygris is a genus of treehoppers belonging to the family Membracidae. It is found in South America.
