= Harmonides =

Scientific classification
- Kingdom: Animalia
- Phylum: Arthropoda
- Class: Insecta
- Order: Hemiptera
- Suborder: Auchenorrhyncha
- Family: Membracidae
- Genus: Harmonides; Kirkaldy, 1902

Genus of insects

Harmonides is a genus of treehopper belonging to the family Membracidae. It was first described by George Willis Kirkaldy in 1902.

== Species ==
This genus contains 4 species:

- Harmonides dispar (Fabricius, 1803)
- Harmonides elongata Creão-Duarte & Sakakibara, 2000
- Harmonides panamensis Creão-Duarte & Sakakibara, 2000
- Harmonides reticulata (Fabricius, 1803)
