= Thestor (mythology) =

In Greek mythology, Thestor (Ancient Greek: Θέστωρ) is a name that may refer to:

- Thestor, son of Idmon and Laothoe, grandson of Apollo; some say that Idmon ("the knowing") was his own surname. By Polymela, he was the father of Calchas, Leucippe and Theonoe.
- Thestor, a Trojan, who was killed by Ajax.
- Thestor, another Trojan, brother of Satnius. They were sons of Enops and a Naiad nymph of the river Satnioeis. Thestor was slain by Patroclus, and Satnius by Ajax the Lesser.
- Thestor, father of Alcmaon. His son fought at Troy and was killed with a spear by the Lycian leader Sarpedon.

== See also ==
- naming citation for Jovian asteroid 4035 Thestor
