= William Weekes Fowler =

English clergyman & entomologist (1849–1923)

Canon William Weekes Fowler
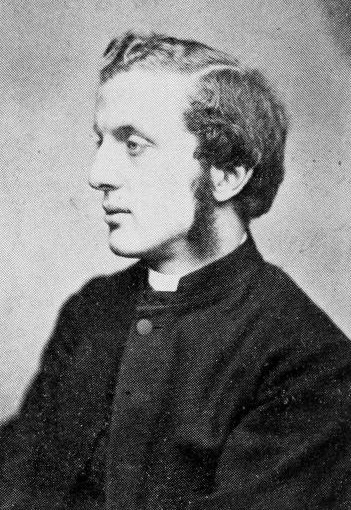
- Portrait c. 1880
- Born: William Weekes Fowler; 1849; Barnwood, Gloucestershire, England
- Died: June 3, 1923 (aged 74); Earley, Berkshire, England
- Citizenship: British
- Known for: The Coleoptera of the British Islands
- Scientific career
- Fields: Entomology (Coleoptera)

William Weekes Fowler (January 1849 – 3 June 1923) was an English clergyman and entomologist mainly interested in beetles.

== Biography ==
Son of the Reverend Hugh Fowler, Vicar of Barnwood, Gloucestershire, Fowler was educated at Rugby School and at Jesus College, Oxford. He became a Master at Repton School in 1873 and was ordained in 1875. In 1880, he became Headmaster of Lincoln Grammar School. This post was relinquished after twenty years. He was then Rector of Rotherfield Peppard, near Henley, Oxfordshire, for three years. His final position was Vicar of St Peter's, Earley, where he collapsed in the vestry before a service and died shortly after it began.

Fowler's other offices were: Canon of Welton Brinkhall at Lincoln (1887), President of the Headmasters Association (HMA) (1907), Vice President of the Linnean Society (1906–1907), Member of the Scientific Committee of the Royal Horticultural Society, and Member of the Reading Guardians.

== Achievements ==
Fowler was first interested in Lepidoptera, then Coleoptera. His expertise in this order led to the publication of the first volume of The Coleoptera of the British Islands (1887–1891, 1913) and to his being appointed Secretary of the Royal Entomological Society, a post which he held for ten years, before, in 1901, he was made President. He was also for 38 years on the editorial panel of the Entomologist's Monthly Magazine. The Coleoptera lists two more genera and fifty more species than appear in H.E. Cox's Handbook, published some thirteen years earlier.

Fowler wrote the introductory volume and account of the Cicindelidae and Paussidae of The Fauna of British India, Including Ceylon and Burma; a contribution to Wytsman's Genera Insectorum on the Languriidae; the sections on Homopterous insects (except the Cicadidae, Fulgoridae, Coccidae and Aleurodidae) for Godman and Salvin's Biologia Centrali-Americana; and two Catalogues of the British fauna, compiled with A. Matthews in 1883 and with David Sharp in 1893. The last is an updated version of Sharp's earlier lists of 1871 and 1883.

Fowler wrote more than 150 short notes for various entomological journals, including a number of obituaries of eminent coleopterists.

== Collection ==
Fowler's collection is in Wollaton Hall, Nottingham. Other specimens collected by him in Lincolnshire, Gloucestershire, Hampshire, Isle of Wight and Solway are to be found in the Hall collection at Oldham Museum.

== Obituary quotes ==
"In his small and apparently delicate frame Fowler held a great store of vitality and an apparently inexhaustible appetite for hard work, notwithstanding which he was by no means a hard taskmaster to those under him, and by his invariably cheerful and amiable disposition never failed to win popularity and esteem from his pupils and associates of every kind. Although possessed of little critical power or gift for origination, he had a taste for the not usually attractive labour of collating and tabulating the records of others' results and a readiness to undertake toil from which other men turned away which led him sometimes into fields for which his qualifications were not apparent. Entomology has reason for gratitude to him for much useful spadework, and, to all who study British Beetles, his principal achievement, the Coleoptera of the British Islands, is the indispensable starting-point for any fresh advance, and is not likely soon to be superseded" (G.J. Arrow Ent., 722, July 1923, p. 170).

"About 1879 Canon Fowler, then a schoolmaster at Repton... developed a purposeful interest in Coleoptera. Realising perhaps that time was not on his side, he established a close contact with the Powers and was thus able to draw extensively on the Doctor's knowledge of our Fauna. For a period Fowler had apartments in the house next door to the Powers as a pied-à-terre for use on his many trips from Lincoln, and this house, No. 83 Ashburnham Road, Bedford, was the wartime HQ of the 5th Beds. Battalion of the Home Guards. 'And who,' asked Miss Power of me on one occasion, "was the young clergyman we always had in the house? My mother said that she thought that he did most of his collecting in my father's cabinets'" (Charles MacKechnie-Jarvis in his 1975 BENHS Presidential Address).

== See also ==
- Category:Taxa named by William Weekes Fowler
