= Troezen (mythology) =

Legendary king of Troezen

In Greek mythology, Troezen (/ˈtriːzən/, Ancient Greek: Τροιζήν, romanized: Troizen) was the eponymous king of the city Troezen.

== Family ==
Troezen was one of the children of Pelops and Hippodamia, and thus brother to Pittheus, Alcathous, Dimoetes, Pleisthenes, Atreus, Thyestes, Copreus, Hippalcimus, Sciron, Cleones, Letreus, Astydameia, Nicippe, Lysidice and Eurydice.

Troezen was the father of Anaphlystus and Sphettus, who migrated to Attica and gave their names to two demes. Evopis was also credited to be the daughter of Troezen.

== Mythology ==
Troezen and Pittheus were said to have come from Pisatis to King Aetius, son of Anthas and grandson of Poseidon and Alcyone, who reigned over the cities of Hyperea and Anthea, and to have become his co-rulers and then successors. When Troezen died, Pittheus incorporated the two cities into one and named it Troezen after his brother.

His daughter Evopis married Dimoetes but had an affair with her own brother (not evident whether this was one of the aforementioned Troezen's sons, or another one). When Dimoetes told Troezen, Evopis committed suicide in shame after cursing Dimoetes.
