= Myrtilus =

Divine hero and son of Hermes

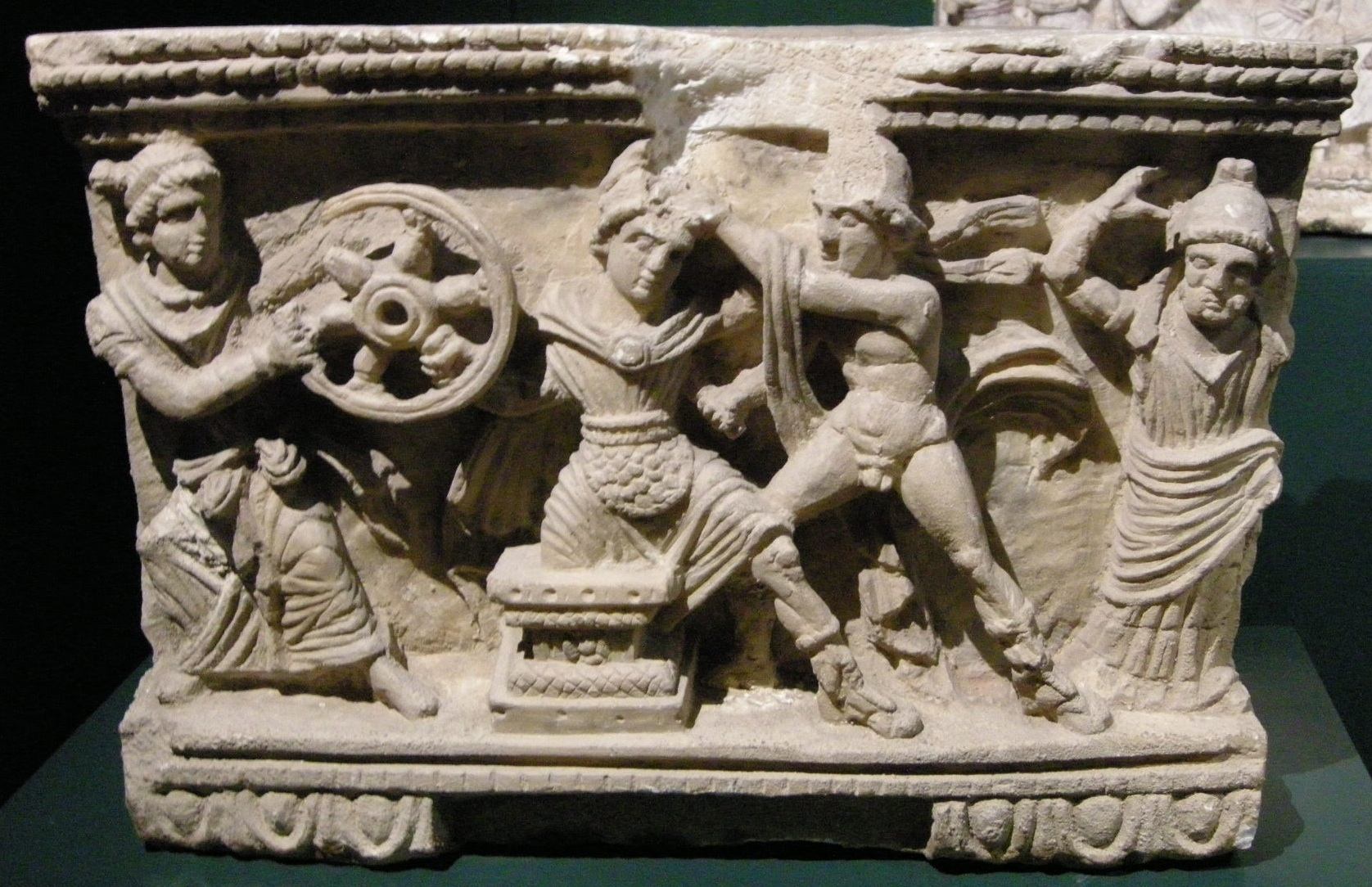
Death of Myrtilus depicted on a cinerary urn

In Greek mythology, Myrtilus or Myrtilos (Ancient Greek: Μυρτίλος, romanized: Murtílos) was a divine hero and son of Hermes. His mother is said variously to be the Amazon Myrto; Phaethusa, daughter of Danaus; or a nymph or mortal woman named Clytie, Clymene or Cleobule (Theobule). Myrtilus was the charioteer of King Oenomaus of Pisa in Elis, on the northwest coast of the Peloponnesus.

== Mythology ==
On the eve of the fateful horse race that would decide the marriage between Pelops and Hippodamia, Myrtilus was approached by Pelops (or in some accounts, by Hippodamia) who wanted him to hinder the efforts of his master, Oenomaus, to win the race, since Oenomaus killed suitors who lost the race to him, and he had always won up to then. Myrtilus was offered as bribe the privilege of the first night with Hippodamia.

Myrtilus, who loved Hippodamia himself but was too afraid to ask her hand of her father, agreed and sabotaged the king's chariot by replacing the bronze linchpins with fake ones made of beeswax. In the ensuing accident Oenomaus lost his life, cursing Myrtilus as he died. Shortly thereafter Myrtilus tried to seduce Hippodamia, who ran crying to Pelops, although Myrtilus said this was the bargain. Enraged, Pelops murdered Myrtilus by casting him into the sea off the east coast of the Peloponnesus, which was later named the Myrtoan Sea in honor of the hero. His body was later recovered and brought in the temple of Hermes where it was honored with annual sacrifices. Some say that Myrtilus was transformed into the constellation of Auriga, the Charioteer.

As Myrtilus died, he cursed Pelops. This curse would haunt future generations of Pelops' family, including Atreus, Thyestes, Agamemnon, Aegisthus, Menelaus, Orestes and Chrysippus. Also, the burial place of Myrtilus was a taraxippus in Olympia.

== Spoken-word myths - audio files ==
Myrtilus myths as told by story tellers

Bibliography of reconstruction: Pindar, Olympian Ode, I (476 BC); Sophocles, (1) Electra, 504 (430 - 415 BC) & (2) Oenomaus, Fr. 433 (408 BC); Euripides, Orestes, 1024-1062 (408 BC); Bibliotheca, Epitome 2, 1–9; Diodorus Siculus, Histories, 4.73 (1st century BC); Hyginus, Fables, 84: Oinomaus; 224: Mortals who were made immortal; Poetic Astronomy, II (1st century AD); Pausanias, Description of Greece, 5.1.3 - 7; 5.13.1; 6.21.9; 8.14.10 - 11 (c. 160 - 176 AD); Philostratus the Elder Imagines, I.30: Pelops (170 - 245 AD); Philostratus the Younger, Imagines, 9: Pelops (c. 200 - 245 AD); First Vatican Mythographer, 22: Myrtilus; Atreus et Thyestes; Second Vatican Mythographer, 146: Oenomaus; Scholia on Apollonius Rhodius, Argonautica, 1. 752; Tzetzes on Lycophron, 157
