= Axioche =

Woman in Greek mythology

Axioche /əɡˈzaɪ.əkiː, æɡ-/ (Ancient Greek: Άξιόχη, romanized: Axiókhē) is a woman or otherwise a nymph in Greek mythology.

== Family ==
Axioche's parentage is not known. She became the mother of Chrysippus by King Pelops, who was already married to Hippodamia, making their son illegitimate. Elsewhere she is referred to as Danais.
