= Philostratus (disambiguation) =

Philostratus may refer to any of four members of Philostratus family in ancient Greece:

- Philostratus I: Philostratus (son of Verus), the father of Flavius Philostratus, and a sophist.
- Philostratus II: Philostratus (Lucius Flavius Philostratus) "the Athenian", (AD 170 – 247) was a Greek sophist of the Roman imperial period.
- Philostratus III: Philostratus of Lemnos (c. AD 190 – c. 230), a son-in-law and probably nephew of Flavius Philostratus, probably author of the 1st series of Imagines
- Philostratus IV: Philostratus the Younger (fl. 3rd century AD), grandson of Philostratus of Lemnos; author of a 2nd series of Imagines
