= Chrysippus of Elis =

Son of Pelops in Greek mythology

Chrysippus
- Prince of Pisa
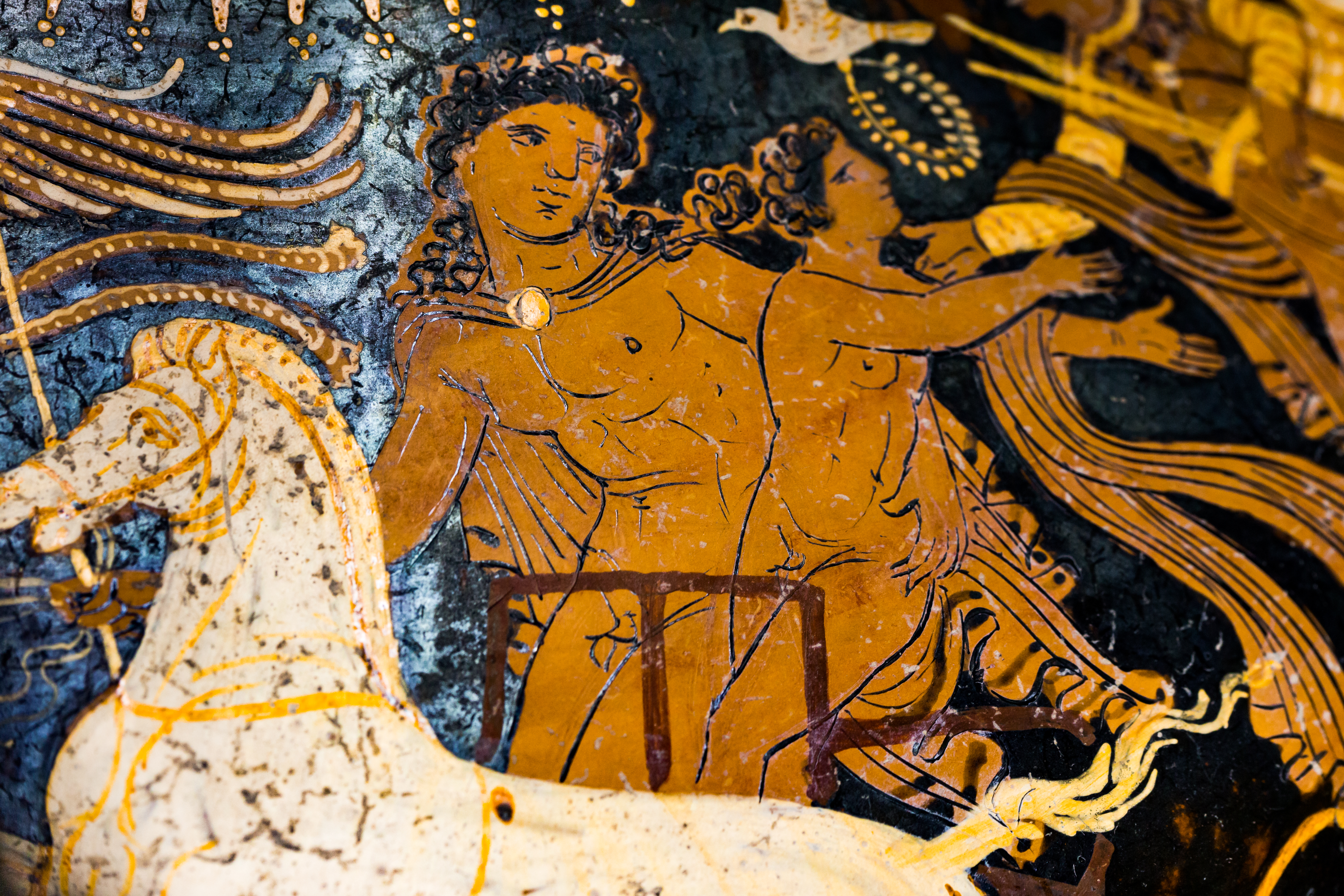
- The abduction of Chrysippus by Laius on an Apulian red-figure hydria, c. 320-310 BC, Archaeological Museum of Fiesole.
- Region: Elis

Genealogy
- Parents: Pelops (father); Axioche or Danais (mother)
- Siblings: Atreus, Thyestes, several other paternal half-siblings

In Greek mythology, Chrysippus (/kraɪˈsɪpəs, krɪ-/; Ancient Greek: Χρύσιππος, romanized: Khrúsippos, lit. 'golden horse') was a divine hero of Elis in the Peloponnesus peninsula (southern Greece), sometimes referred to as Chrysippus of Pisa. He is traditionally the son of Pelops by a nymph, born out of wedlock.

Chrysippus is notable for his abduction by Laius, prince of Thebes who was warmly received at Pisa and Pelops' court but became infatuated with Chrysippus due to his good looks. Laius' actions would result in Pelops' terrible curse being cast over him and his descendants. Chrysippus' life was eventually cut short by his jealous half-brothers Atreus and Thyestes who murdered him in cold blood.

== Family ==
Chrysippus was the bastard son of Pelops, king of Pisa in the western Peloponnesus, and the nymph Axioche or Danais. In Hellanicus however he was a legitimate son from a previous marriage instead. According to Pseudo-Plutarch, of all his children Pelops loved Chrysippus best.

== Mythology ==
=== Laius ===
The beautiful Chrysippus lived in his father Pelops' palace in Pisa when Pelops welcomed the exiled Theban prince Laius, who then became the boy's tutor. Laius fell in love with the pretty youth, and undertook the responsibility to escort him to the Nemean Games, where the boy planned to compete. Instead, Laius carried him off to Thebes and there he raped him, a crime for which he, his city, and his family were cursed. Other ones named as Chrysippus' kidnapper include Zeus, and even Theseus. (Note: Perhaps merely a mistake as elsewhere Hyginus recounts the standard tale. Chrysippus is Theseus' grand-uncle.) Laius was credited as the first man to introduce the love of nobleborn boys; this was supposedly the reason why the Thebans considered it a good thing to love the handsome, apparently not discouraged by Laius and Oedipus' fates.

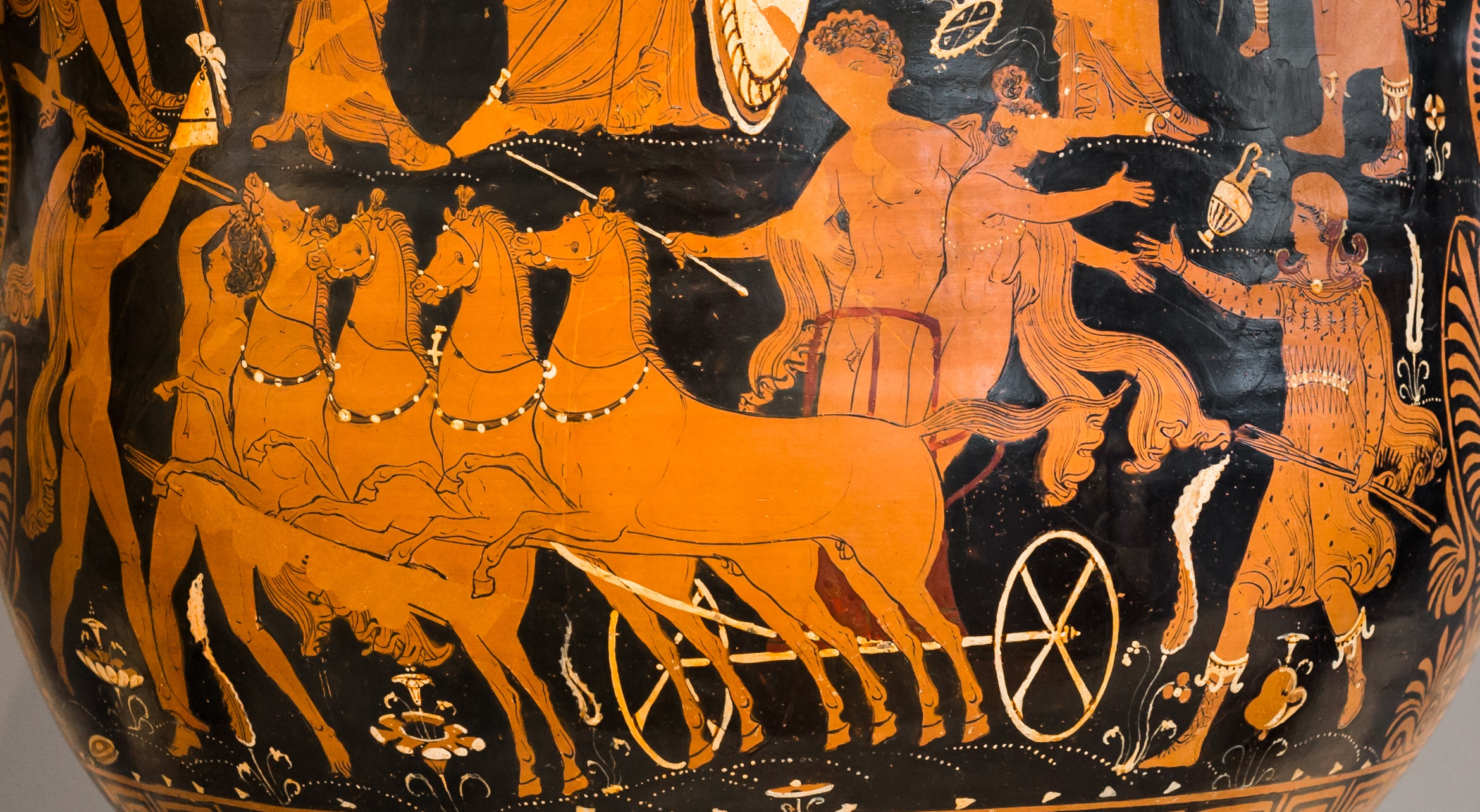
Chrysippus is carried off by Laius, Apulian red-figure bell-krater c. 350-340 BC, kept in Altes Museum, Berlin.

In one version Chrysippus' father Pelops, following his son's abduction, cursed Laius to be killed by one of his own children. Pelops also waged a war against Laius in order to get his son back. In a different one Chrysippus' half-brothers Atreus and Thyestes caught Laius and retrieved Chrysippus, but Laius excused himself saying he had acted out of love so Pelops pardoned him. One late scholiast who cites Peisander (though possibly not the same as the Archaic poet) as his source claims that Chrysippus killed himself with his sword out of shame over what had transpired with Laius. A rare version, preserved in scholia and ancient art, bypasses the curse of Pelops entirely; from what can be extracted, the exposed infant Oedipus was adopted not by Polybus and Merope but Hippodamia and Pelops. Laius then abducted Oedipus' assumed brother Chrysippus, causing Oedipus to kill Laius. Another scholion suggests Oedipus also desired Chrysippus, and fought his father over their common desire.

Chrysippus' violation by Laius might have been the direct cause behind the Thebans' woes in the lost epic Oedipodea (the ancient poem that recounted the story of Oedipus), (Note: Supposing the hypothesis that the myth was invented by Euripides is rejected.) as far as it can be reconstructed based on other authors' testimonies. Hera, as the goddess of marriage, was enraged at Laius and his unlawful, contrary to traditional marriage, actions, and sent the terrible Sphinx to attack the Thebans in revenge for not punishing the impious Laius, while Oedipus' defeat of her did little to appease the goddess. The theory is far from certain, and several other transgressions could have motivated Hera.

=== Envious brothers ===
Chrysippus' death had many other variations. Hellanicus of Lesbos and Thucydides for example wrote that Chrysippus was murdered out of jealousy by Atreus and Thyestes, who cast him into a well. They usually act on their mother Hippodamia's suggestion, envious as she was of Pelops' love for Chrysippus and afraid that he was going to leave his kingdom to the boy. In one author, after Chrysippus' retrieval from Laius Hippodamia took matters in her own hands when her sons refused to involve themselves, and after stealing the sleeping Laius' sword, she thrust it into Chrysippus' belly and left it there so that suspicion would fall upon Laius. Chrysippus however lived just long enough to reveal the truth with his dying breath.

Afterwards, no matter the direct culprit Pelops blamed Hippodamia for Chrysippus' demise, so she killed herself, or she withdrew to Midea in the Argolid, far away from Elis and Pelops. He also exiled his sons, and cursed them to have their descendants cause each other's perish, an anathema that came to be known as the curse of the Atreidae.

The death of Chrysippus is sometimes seen as springing from the curse that Myrtilus placed on Pelops for his betrayal, as many years before Pelops had thrown him off a cliff after he helped Pelops win the chariot race that landed him Hippodamia as a wife.

== In ancient Greek drama ==
None of this advice you are giving me has escaped me, yet though I am mindful of it, nature compels me.

— Euripides frag. 840 (trans. Collard & Cropp).

It is known that Athenian tragedian Euripides wrote a play called Chrysippus, which is now lost with few details preserved, but it is the earliest known account of Chrysippus' tale. Its plot covered Laius and the boy's death, with a theme centered around the relations between men and boys, specifically Laius' failure to control his desire, the abduction and Chrysippus' death. Arguments have been proposed both for and against Euripides being the one who invented the story in the first place.

Presumably, it opened with the arrival of Laius at Pisa, his first encounter with Chrysippus and his inner struggle with his desires; surviving fragments suggest Chrysippus' rejection of him, which motivated Laius' abduction, perhaps under the pretext of teaching Chrysippus chariot-driving. The play probably ended with an eye-witness reporting the events to Pelops, the return of Chrysippus' body, and Pelops' curse. An ancient hypothesis to Euripides' play The Phoenician Women supports this structure. The fragment where Laius blames nature for his actions could have been addressed to a confidant or even Chrysippus himself, during the failed seduction or even the abduction. It is not beyond likelihood that an actual chariot was brought on stage, given that Strattis' lost comedy Chrysippus, modelled on Euripides, did feature a chariot, but it is also just as likely that a messenger described the events.

It is not so clear whether the play condemned the pederasty as is, or just Laius' use of force and abuse of sacred hospitality; Hubbard notes that the first pederast being also the first to abduct and violently rape a child, who ended up killing himself over the shame, means that the play likely was a middle-class reaction to the elite's pederastic customs. Euripides making Laius the first to conceive a passion for males also suggests that this, meaning his consuming passion being so perverse it had no precedent at all, was key point in Laius' inner struggle; nevertheless this does not mean Laius was portrayed as a complete monster, and his character could have solicited some sympathy or pity in his battle against his feelings. Other plays by Euripides also portray male homosexuality negatively. Chrysippus is theorised to have been originally included in the same trilogy as the lost Oenomaus and The Phoenician Women, which survives. If true, then the common theme connecting these stories would be the relation between men and their children as well as erotic passion.

Those elements were probably also present in the earlier and similarly lost tragedy Laius by Aeschylus. Chrysippus' rape might have been the transgression that has turned Apollo against Laius in Seven Against Thebes, which was part of the same trilogy as Laius, but this cannot be confirmed because of the vagueness of the text, for the ancient author would have expected his audience to be already familiar with his previous plays that had premiered earlier the same day. Hubbard disagrees that Chrysippus' violation was part of Aeschylus' mythos, and that Laius disobeying Apollo was enough. Another play titled Chrysippus by Accius probably covered the Hippodamia version.

== Interpretation ==
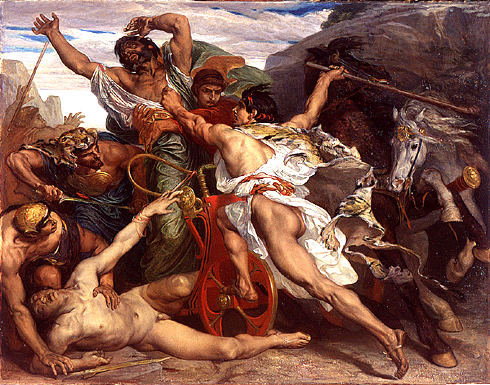
The Murder of Laius by Oedipus, by Joseph Blanc.

Fowler claimed that myths about curses of the royal houses of Mycenae and Thebes were likely used to explain the collapse of Bronze Age Greece, as due to the culminating wars all the great families were extinguished. What exact nature of those curses, particularly their generational extend and reach, was in Archaic literature is not clear. The idea of an ancestral curse gained a lot traction in the fifth century BC, as evidenced by the works of the tragedians.

Although most authors use the words harpazein or anarpazein (meaning 'to abduct' and 'to snatch up', rapio in Latin), which do not necessarily have sexual connotations, to describe the incident, nevertheless Chrysippus' myth is definitely a story about rape, as evidenced by use of words deriving from erao such as eros or erastheis, and Chrysippus' own suicide out of aiskhyne ("shame"). The exact origin of the violation myth has been much debated; an origin from the lost Oedipodea has been proposed but also challenged. Epic tradition did connect the houses of Pelops and Cadmus through marriage. Hubbard suggested that it does have pre-Euripidean origins, as Praxilla mentioned an abduction of Chrysippus by Zeus, but was mostly integrated into the Labdacid mythological corpus after the play was produced. Furthermore, he states that Hera's anger and punishment via the sphinx is not always connected to Chrysippus, while sometimes the sphinx appeared after Laius' death at the command of another god. Strong condemnations of pederasty do not appear until Plato's Laws, while epic poetry itself does not explicitly contain homosexual themes, making it unlikely that both of those elements were present in the myth particularly early. Praxilla might have modelled her rendition on the myth of Pelops and Poseidon's romance, as the two myths share a similar structure and a genealogical connection. Apollodorus in the Bibliotheca seems to have drawn from Euripides, but perhaps the combination of Laius' exile and the abduction was unique to him, possibly in order to create a coherent narrative with those multiple epidodes.

The versions where Pelops manages to retrieve Chrysippus seem to have been invented in order to reconcile the two main but conflicting narratives of Chrysippus, his abduction (and eventual suicide) with his murder by his brothers. Supposing the boy does not commit suicide, his final fate does not necessarily exclude him having been kidnapped earlier, but putting those stories in the same framework has been described as 'hard'; nevertheless some antiquity authors did manage to combine them. Pelops' pardon of Laius in the pseudo-Plutarchic version would equal an acceptance of the pederastic relationship, which in an ancient Greek context meant that the actions of Laius were legitimised by the consent of the father, the legal authority, and would not be socially or legally seen as rape. It is possible that the story is from a lost tragedy that presented the pederasty in a more positive light as a direct response to Euripides' negative attack on it, or that Dositheus (pseudo-Plutarch's source) combined some Atreus tragedy with Euripides' Chrysippus to create the melodramatic variation.

Devereux suggested that, taking in account the version where Oedipus and Laius fight over Chrysippus, the dispute between father and son as to who would go first through the 'narrow road' was a euphemism for the anal penetration of the youth. The versions with an amorous Oedipus likely originated from comedies parodying Euripides' works. Comedies titled Chrysippus and Phoenissae are known to have existed, and in the former Pelops is presented as an overprotective father who does not let his son go to the latrine out of fear of strange men talking to him.

== Iconography ==
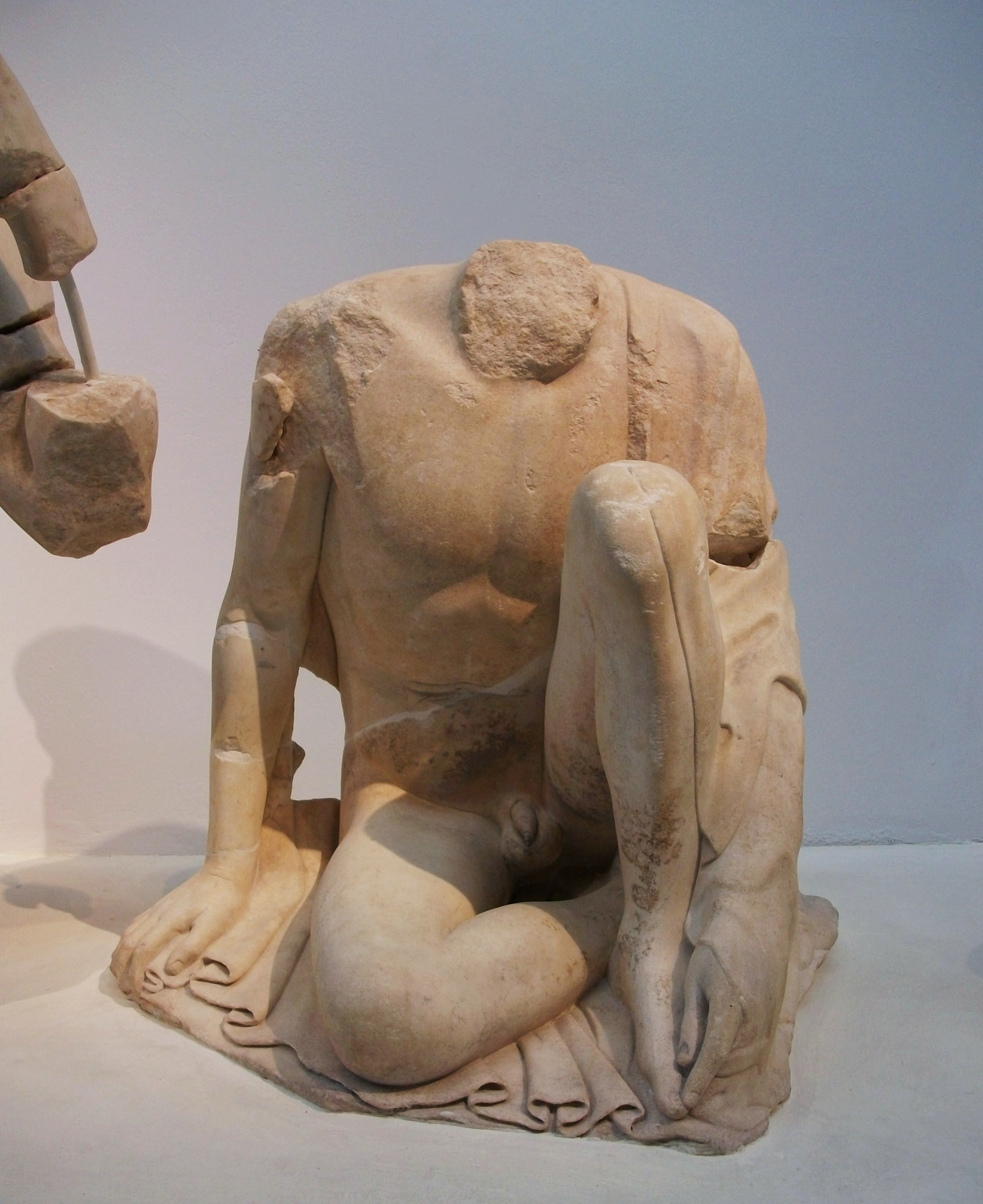
The kneeling boy identified as Chrysippus by some on the eastern pediment of temple of Zeus from Olympia, 5th-century BC.

Chrysippus does not appear in archaic Greek art; he and his myth became very popular in South Italic vases around the fourth century BC, clearly influenced by Euripides' stage whose works were very popular in south Italy. Several vases show Laius grabbing Chrysippus by the waist and taking him away on a chariot, while the boy raises his arms and pleads for help to the various figures that pursue the chariot, identified as a paedagogus, Pelops, and two young men who could be Atreus and Thyestes. Scenes that can be interpreted as Chrysippus' abduction are also found in Etruscan pottery. A point of interest is Chrysippus' smallness compared to all the other figures depicted, his small size denoting both age of ten to thirteen and emphasising his vulnerability and victimhood next to the adult Laius.

Meanwhile, a subversion is present in a panathenaic amphora dated between 340 and 330 BC that shows Chrysippus holding onto the chariot, over which Eros is hovering, without trying to escape Laius' embrace, while Aphrodite calms down a paedagogus who is chasing after them; this was likely the artist's personal interpretation, though it might also mean that Eros' presence symbolises Laius' success. One of the vases juxtaposes Laius' actions with the Judgement of Paris, paralleling two myths that both resulted in a fateful, aphrodisiac abduction.

An unidentified kneeling boy with a cloak sitting on Pelops' side from the eastern pediment of the temple of Zeus at Olympia has been suggested to be Chrysippus, among many other figures. The ominous mood of the pediment's scene can lead to the assumption that the sculptor intended to depict the misfortunes of those royal houses, the Labdacids and the Pelopids, though we cannot know which version of Chrysippus he had in mind.

== See also ==
- List of rape victims from history and mythology
- Ocyrhoë
- Cydippe
- Persephone

== Bibliography ==
=== Ancient sources ===
- Aelian, Historical Miscellany, translated by Nigel G. Wilson. Loeb Classical Library 486. Cambridge, MA: Harvard University Press, 1997. Available at Loeb Classical Library.
- Apollodorus, The Library, with an English Translation by Sir James George Frazer, F.B.A., F.R.S. in 2 Volumes. Cambridge, MA, Harvard University Press; London, William Heinemann Ltd. 1921. Online version at the Perseus Digital Library.
- Athenaeus (1927–1941). Gulick, Charles Burton (ed.). Deipnosophistae [Scholars at Dinner]. Loeb Classical Library (in Ancient Greek). Heinemann & Harvard University Press. 15 books in 7 vols. LCCN 28004492. OCLC 688821.
- Euripides (2009). Collard, Christopher; Cropp, Martin (eds.). Fragments: Oedipus-Chrysippus. Other Fragments. Loeb Classical Library 506. Cambridge, MA: Harvard University Press. ISBN 978-0-674-99631-1.
- Hellanicus of Lesbos, Fragmenta, edited and translated into Latin by Friedrich Wilhelm Sturz. Leipzig, 1826. Archive.
- Hyginus, Gaius Julius, The Myths of Hyginus. Edited and translated by Mary A. Grant, Lawrence: University of Kansas Press, 1960.
- Pausanias, Description of Greece with an English Translation by W.H.S. Jones, Litt.D., and H.A. Ormerod, M.A., in 4 Volumes. Cambridge, MA, Harvard University Press; London, William Heinemann Ltd. 1918. Online version at the Perseus Digital Library.
- Plato, Cratylus in Plato in Twelve Volumes, Vol. 12 translated by Harold N. Fowler. Cambridge, MA, Harvard University Press; London, William Heinemann Ltd. 1921. Available online at Perseus Digital Library.
- Plutarch, pseudo-, Parallela Minora in The Moralia, with an English Translation by Frank Cole Babbitt. Cambridge, MA. Harvard University Press. London. William Heinemann Ltd. 1936. 4. Online version at topos text.
- Sophocles, The Electra of Sophocles, edited with introduction and notes by Sir Richard Jebb. Sir Richard Jebb. Cambridge. Cambridge University Press. 1894. Cambridge: University Press Warehouse, Ave Maria Lane. Glasgow: 363, Argyle Street. Online version at the Perseus Digital Library.
- Thucydides, History of the Peloponnesian War, Volume I: Books 1–2. Translated by C. F. Smith. Loeb Classical Library 108. Cambridge, MA: Harvard University Press, 1919. Available at Loeb Classical Library.

=== Modern sources ===
- Avery, Catherine B., ed. (1962). New Century Classical Handbook. New York, US: Appleton-Century-Crofts.
- Bell, Robert E. (1991). Women of Classical Mythology: A Biographical Dictionary. ABC-Clio. ISBN 9780874365818.
- Fowler, Robert L. (2000). Early Greek Mythography. Vol. 2: Commentary. Oxford, UK: Oxford University Press. ISBN 978-0-19-814741-1.
- Fry, Stephen (2018). Heroes. Chronicle Books. ISBN 978-1797201863.
- Gantz, Timothy (1996). Early Greek Myth: A Guide to Literary and Artistic Sources. Vol. II. Baltimore: Johns Hopkins University Press. ISBN 978-0-8018-5362-3.
- Grimal, Pierre (1987). The Dictionary of Classical Mythology. Wiley-Blackwell. ISBN 0-631-13209-0.
- Hard, Robin (2004). The Routledge Handbook of Greek Mythology: Based on H.J. Rose's "Handbook of Greek Mythology". Routledge. ISBN 9780415186360.
- Hathorn, Richmond Y. (1967). Crowell's Handbook to Classical Drama. NYC, United States: Thomas Y. Crowell Company. ISBN 0-690-22501-6.
- Hubbard, Thomas K. (27 July 2011). "History's First Child Molester: Euripides' Chrysippus and the Marginalization of Pederasty in Athenian Democratic Discourse". Bulletin of the Institute of Classical Studies. 49. Austin, TX: University of Texas.
- Michels, Johanna Astrid (2023). "Theban Myths: Amphion & Zethus and the Labdacids (III.40–47)". Agenorid Myth in the ›Bibliotheca‹ of Pseudo-Apollodorus: A Philological Commentary of Bibl. III.1-56 and a Study into the Composition and Organization of the Handbook. Beiträge zur Altertumskunde. Vol. 42. Berlin, Boston: De Gruyter. ISBN 9783110610529.
- Rodrigues, Nuno Simões (2023). "5: The Rape of Chrysippus". In Deacy, Susan; Magalhães, José Malheiro; Zacharski Menzies, Jean (eds.). Revisiting Rape in Antiquity: Sexualised Violence in Greek and Roman Worlds. Bloomsbury Publishing.
- Scheer, Tanja (October 1, 2006). "Chrysippus". In Cancik, Hubert; Schneider, Helmuth (eds.). Brill's New Pauly. Translated by Christine F. Salazar. Rome: Brill Reference Online. ISSN 1574-9347.
- Schefold, Karl (1986). "Chrysippos I". Lexicon Iconographicum Mythologiae Classicae (LIMC). Vol. III.1: Atherion – Eros. Zürich and Munich: Artemis Verlag. Internet Archive.
- Smith, William (1873). A Dictionary of Greek and Roman Biography and Mythology. London, UK: John Murray, printed by Spottiswoode and Co. Online version at the Perseus.tufts library.
- Tripp, Edward (June 1970). Crowell's Handbook of Classical Mythology (1st ed.). Thomas Y. Crowell Co. ISBN 069022608X.
- Tsagalis, Christos (December 5, 2022). Early Greek Epic: Language, Interpretation, Performance. De Gruyter. ISBN 9783110981384.
