= Myrtoan Sea =

Part of the Mediterranean Sea between the Cyclades and the Peloponnese

- Interactive map of Myrtoan Sea
- Location: Mediterranean Sea
- Coordinates: 37°N 24°E

The Myrtoan Sea (also Mirtoan Sea and Myrtoum Mare; Greek: Μυρτώο Πέλαγος, romanized: Mirtóo Pélagos Greek pronunciation: [mirˈto.o ˈpelaɣos]) is a subdivision of the Mediterranean Sea that lies between the Cyclades and Peloponnese. It is described as the part of the Aegean Sea south of Euboea, Attica, and Argolis. Some of the water mass of the Black Sea reaches the Myrtoan Sea, via transport through the Aegean Sea (Saundry, Hogan & Baum 2011).

The Saronic Gulf, the gulf of Athens, lies between the Corinth Canal and the Myrtoan Sea.

It is said to have been named after the mythical hero Myrtilus, who was thrown into this sea by an enraged Pelops. It is also said to have derived its name from a small island named Myrtus. The name has also been connected with that of the maiden Myrto.
