= Pelops =

Mythical character

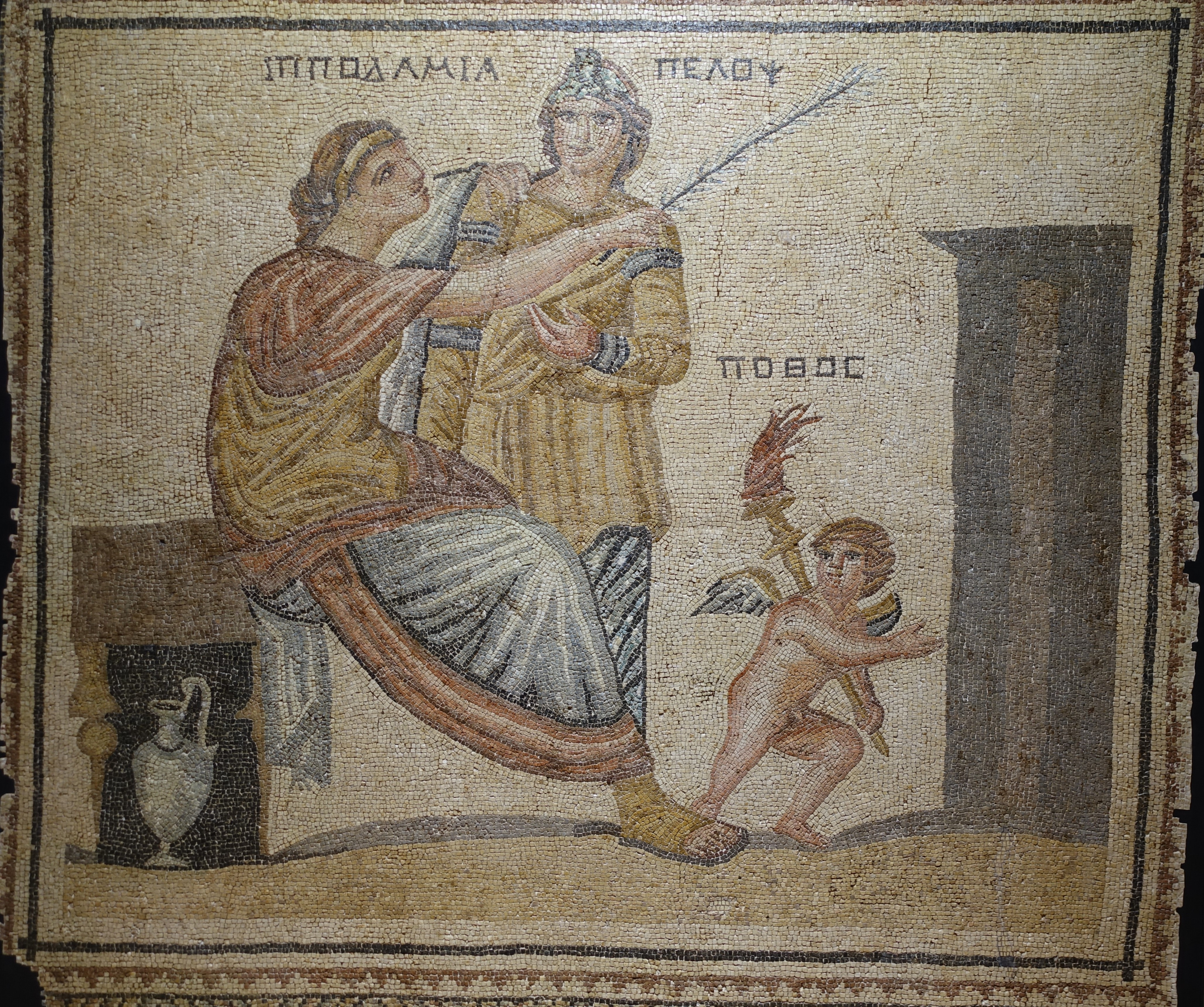
Roman mosaic with Pelops and Hippodamia, kept in the D. Diogo de Sousa Museum in Braga, Portugal.

In Greek mythology, Pelops (/ˈpiːlɒps, ˈpɛlɒps/; Ancient Greek: Πέλοψ, romanized: Pélops) was king of Pisa in the Peloponnesus region (Πελοπόννησος, lit. "Pelops's Island"). He was the son of Tantalus and the father of Atreus.

He was venerated at Olympia, where his cult developed into the founding myth of the Olympic Games, the most important expression of unity, not only for the people of Peloponnesus, but for all Hellenes. At the sanctuary at Olympia, chthonic night-time libations were offered each time to "dark-faced" Pelops in his sacrificial pit (bothros) before they were offered in the following daylight to the sky-god Zeus (Burkert 1983:96).

== Family ==
Pelops was a son of Tantalus and either Dione, Euryanassa, Eurythemista, Eupryto and Clytia. In some accounts, he was called a bastard son of Tantalus while others named his parents as Atlas and the nymph Linos. Others would make Pelops the son of Hermes and Calyce while another says that he was an Achaean from Olenus.

Of Phrygian or Lydian birth, he departed his homeland for Greece, and won the crown of Pisa or Olympia from King Oenomaus in a chariot race, then married Oenomaus's daughter, Hippodamia.

Pelops and Hippodamia had numerous children. Their sons include Pittheus (or his mother was Dia), Troezen, Alcathous, Dimoetes, Atreus, Thyestes, Copreus, Hippalcimus (Hippalcus, Hippalcmus, Hippalmus), Sciron, Sicyon, Epidaurus, Cleones (Cleonymus, Cleon), Letreus, Dyspontos, Pelops the younger, Argeius (Argo), Dias, Aelius (Heleius), Corinthus, Cynosurus and Hippasus.

Four of their daughters married into the House of Perseus: Astydameia (who married Alcaeus), Nicippe (who married Sthenelus), Lysidice (who married Mestor), and Eurydice (who married Electryon). Another daughter of Pelops, Mytilene was called the mother of Myton by Poseidon.

By the nymph Axioche (Ἀξιόχη) or Danais Pelops was father of Chrysippus. The latter was also called the son of Hippodamia and brother of Pleisthenes who was sometimes called the son of Pelops by another woman.

Comparative table of Pelops's family
Relation	Names	Sources																				
Relation	Names	Homer		(Sch. on) Pher.	Pindar				Euripides			Apollodorus		Plutarch		Hyginus		Pausanias	Stephanus	Apostolius		Others
Relation	Names	-	Sch.	(Sch. on) Pher.	-	Scholia			-	Scholia		Apollodorus		Plutarch		Hyginus		Pausanias	Stephanus	Apostolius		Others
Parents	Tantalus				✔											✔						Tyrtaeus, Cypria, Simonides
Parents	Hermes and Calyce		✔																			
Parents	Tantalus and Clytia			✔																		
Parents	Tantalus and Eurythemiste									✔												
Parents	Tantalus and Euryanassa									✔												Tzetzes
Parents	Tantalus and Dione															✔						
Parents	Tantalus and Eupryto																			✔		
Wife	Hippodamia						✔					✔		✔		✔				✔		
Wife	Dia					✔																
Wife	Axioche							✔			✔										✔	
Wife	Danais														✔							
Sons	Atreus	✔										✔		✔		✔				✔		
Sons	Thyestes	✔										✔		✔		✔				✔		
Sons	Argeius or		✔	✔						✔												
Sons	Argo																			✔		
Sons	Cleonymus or			✔																		Acusilaus
Sons	Cleones or									✔								✔				
Sons	Cleon																			✔		
Sons	Pittheus					✔			✔	✔		✔		✔				✔		✔		
Sons	Alcathous						✔			✔			✔					✔		✔		
Sons	Troezen									✔								✔		✔		
Sons	Hippalcmus or						✔			✔												
Sons	Hippalcus or															✔						
Sons	Hippalcimus or															✔						
Sons	Hippalmus																			✔		
Sons	Pelops the Younger						✔															
Sons	Dias						✔			✔										✔		
Sons	(A)Eleius or									✔												
Sons	Heleius																			✔		
Sons	Corinthus or									✔												
Sons	Corinthius																			✔		
Sons	Cynosurus									✔										✔		
Sons	Hippasus									✔										✔		
Sons	Dimoetes																					?Parthenius
Sons	Copreus												✔									
Sons	Sciron												✔									
Sons	Sicyon																	✔				
Sons	Epidaurus																	✔				
Sons	Letreus																	✔				
Sons	Dyspontos																		✔			
Sons	Chrysippus						✔	✔			✔		✔		✔		✔				✔	
Sons	Pleisthenes						✔															
Daughters	Eurydice																					Diodorus
Daughters	Lysidice												✔	✔				✔		✔		
Daughters	Astydamia												✔									
Daughters	Nicippe												✔							✔		
Daughters	Mytilene																		✔			

== Mythology ==
=== Tantalus's savage banquet ===
Pelops's father was Tantalus, king at Mount Sipylus in Anatolia. Wanting to make an offering to the Olympians, Tantalus cut Pelops into pieces and made his flesh into a stew, then served it to the gods. Demeter, deep in grief after the abduction of her daughter Persephone by Hades, absentmindedly accepted the offering and ate the left shoulder. The other gods sensed the plot, however, and held off from eating of the boy's body. While Tantalus was banished to Tartarus, Pelops was ritually reassembled and brought back to life, his shoulder replaced with one of ivory made for him by Hephaestus. Pindar mentioned this tradition in his First Olympian Ode, only to reject it as a malicious invention. Instead, Pindar relates that he was taken by Poseidon and the story of his death was a rumour spread after his disappearance by neighbours envious of Tantalus's prosperity.

After Pelops's resurrection, Poseidon took him to Olympus, and made him the youth apprentice, teaching him also to drive the divine chariot. Later, Zeus found out about the gods' stolen food and their now revealed secrets, and threw Pelops out of Olympus, angry at his father, Tantalus.

=== Courting Hippodamia ===
Having grown to manhood, Pelops wanted to marry Hippodamia. Her father, King Oenomaus, fearful of a prophecy that claimed he would be killed by his son-in-law, had killed eighteen suitors of Hippodamia after defeating them in a chariot race and affixed their heads to the wooden columns of his palace. Pausanias was shown what was supposedly the last standing column in the late second century CE; he wrote that Pelops erected a monument in honor of all the suitors who had preceded him:

1. Marmax
2. Alcathous, son of Porthaon
3. Euryalus
4. Eurymachus
5. Crotalus
6. Acrias of Lacedaemon, founder of Acriae
7. Capetus
8. Lycurgus
9. Lasius
10. Chalcodon
11. Tricolonus, descendant of another Tricolonus
12. Aristomachus
13. Prias
14. Pelagon
15. Aeolius
16. Cronius
17. Erythras, son of Leucon
18. Eioneus, son of Magnes

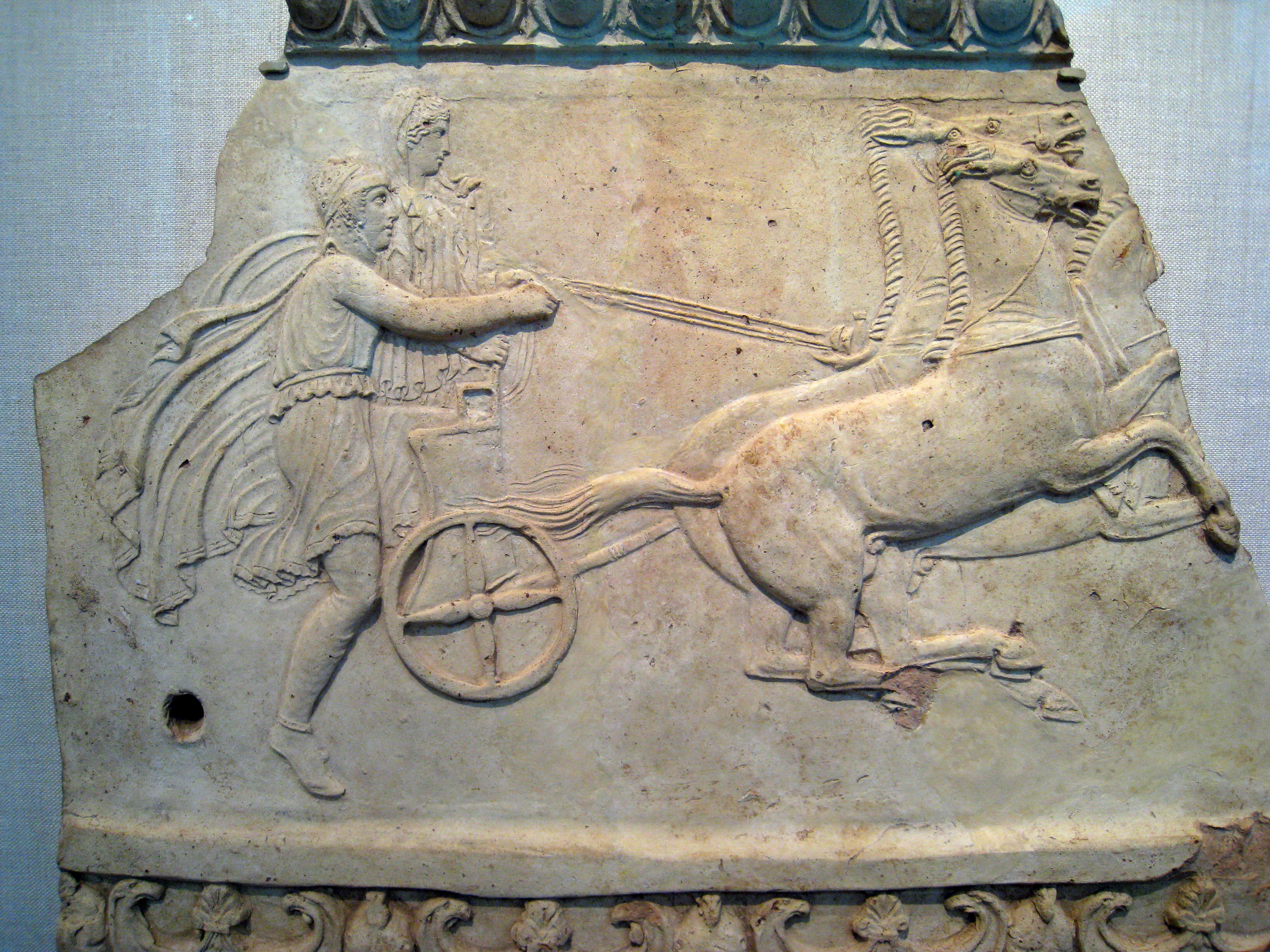
Pelops and Hippodamia racing in a bas-relief (Metropolitan Museum of Art)

Pelops came to ask for her hand and prepared to race Oenomaus. Worried about losing, Pelops went to the seaside and invoked Poseidon. Reminding Poseidon of their friendship, he asked Poseidon for help. Smiling, Poseidon caused a chariot drawn by untamed winged horses to appear.

Two episodes involving charioteers were added into the plain account of the heroic chariot race. In the first related by Theopompus, having received the horses, Pelops hastens to Pisa to defeat Oenomaus. On the way, his charioteer Cillus (also named Sphaerus) dies and stands in a dream over Pelops, who was highly distressed about him, to make requests for a funeral. Pelops complies by burying his ashes magnificently; he raises a mound to erect a temple dedicated to Apollo, which he names Apollo Cillaeus, and also founds a city besides the mound and the temple which he also names Cilla, after his charioteer and friend. Both the temple and the city are mentioned in the first book of Homer's Iliad and suggestions regarding their exact location have been made. Furthermore, Cillus, even after his death, appears to have helped Pelops's cause in order for him to win the race.

The second, found in several versions, has Pelops, still unsure of himself, the winged horses and chariot of divine providence he had secured. Oenomaus's charioteer, Myrtilus, a son of Hermes, is persuaded to help Pelops win by promising Myrtilus half of Oenomaus's kingdom and the first night in bed with Hippodamia. The night before the race, while Myrtilus was putting together Oenomaus's chariot, he replaced the bronze linchpins attaching the wheels to the chariot axle with fake ones made of beeswax. The race started, and went on for a long time, but just as Oenomaus was catching up to Pelops and readying to kill him, the wheels flew off and the chariot broke apart. Myrtilus survived, but Oenomaus was dragged to death by his horses. Here lies the main differences in the versions, while all then see Pelops kill Myrtilus (by throwing him off a cliff into the sea) after the latter attempted to rape Hippodamia, some have Pelops give the promise to Myrtilus of Hippodamia's virginity and then either renege the agreement or Myrtilus being impatient and trying to take her beforehand, others have Hippodamia, noticing Pelops's insecurity, giving the promise behind the back of Pelops, who then falsely believed it was an attempted rape.

=== Olympic Games ===
After his victory, Pelops organized chariot races as thanksgiving to the gods and as funeral games in honor of King Oenomaus, in order to be purified of his death. It was from this funeral race held at Olympia that the beginnings of the ancient Olympic Games were inspired. Pelops became a great king, a local hero, and gave his name to the Peloponnese. Walter Burkert notes that though the story of Hippodamia's abduction figures in the Hesiodic Catalogue of Women and on the chest of Cypselus (c. 570 BCE) that was conserved at Olympia, and though preparations for the chariot-race figured in the east pediment of the great temple of Zeus at Olympia, the myth of the chariot race only became important at Olympia with the introduction of chariot racing in the twenty-fifth Olympiad (680 BCE). G. Devereux connected the abduction of Hippodamia with animal husbandry taboos of Elis, and the influence of Elis at Olympia that grew in the seventh century.

=== Curse of the Pelopidai ===
As Myrtilus died, he cursed Pelops for his ultimate betrayal. This was one of the sources of the curse that destroyed his family: two of his sons, Atreus and Thyestes, killed their half brother, Chrysippus, who was his favorite son and was meant to inherit the kingdom; Atreus and Thyestes were banished by him together with Hippodamia, their mother, who then hanged herself; each successive generation of descendants suffered greatly by atrocious crimes and compounded the curse by committing more crimes, as the curse weighed upon Pelops's children, grandchildren, and great-grandchildren including Atreus, Thyestes, Agamemnon, Aegisthus, Menelaus, and finally Orestes, who was acquitted by a court of law convened by the gods Athena and Apollo. Although commonly referred to as "the curse of the Atreides", the circle of atrocious events began two generations before Atreus and continued for two generations after him, before being formally absolved by the Furies in court. Many decades after Pelops's death, his grandson Menelaus, having survived the long-lasting Trojan War and stranded in Egypt, would recount his numerous plights and wish Pelops had perished for good at Tantalus's dinner, so that Atreus, and therefore Agamemnon and Menelaus himself, would never have been born.

== Cult ==
=== Origin ===
Pelops is believed to have Anatolian origins. He may have been originally worshipped in Phrygia or Lydia or both. Other ancient mythographers connect him with Paphlagonia. He may have come from the Paphlagonian town of Enete. Thucydides says simply that Pelops was "from Asia".

Others represent him as a native of Greece, who came from Olenos in Achaia, or perhaps from Arcadia.

Also, according to Strabo, Pelops's cult may have come to the Peloponnese originally from Phthiotis, and was first based in Laconia: "... the Achaeans of Phthiotis came down with Pelops into the Peloponnesus, took up their abode in Laconia ..."

=== Shrines ===
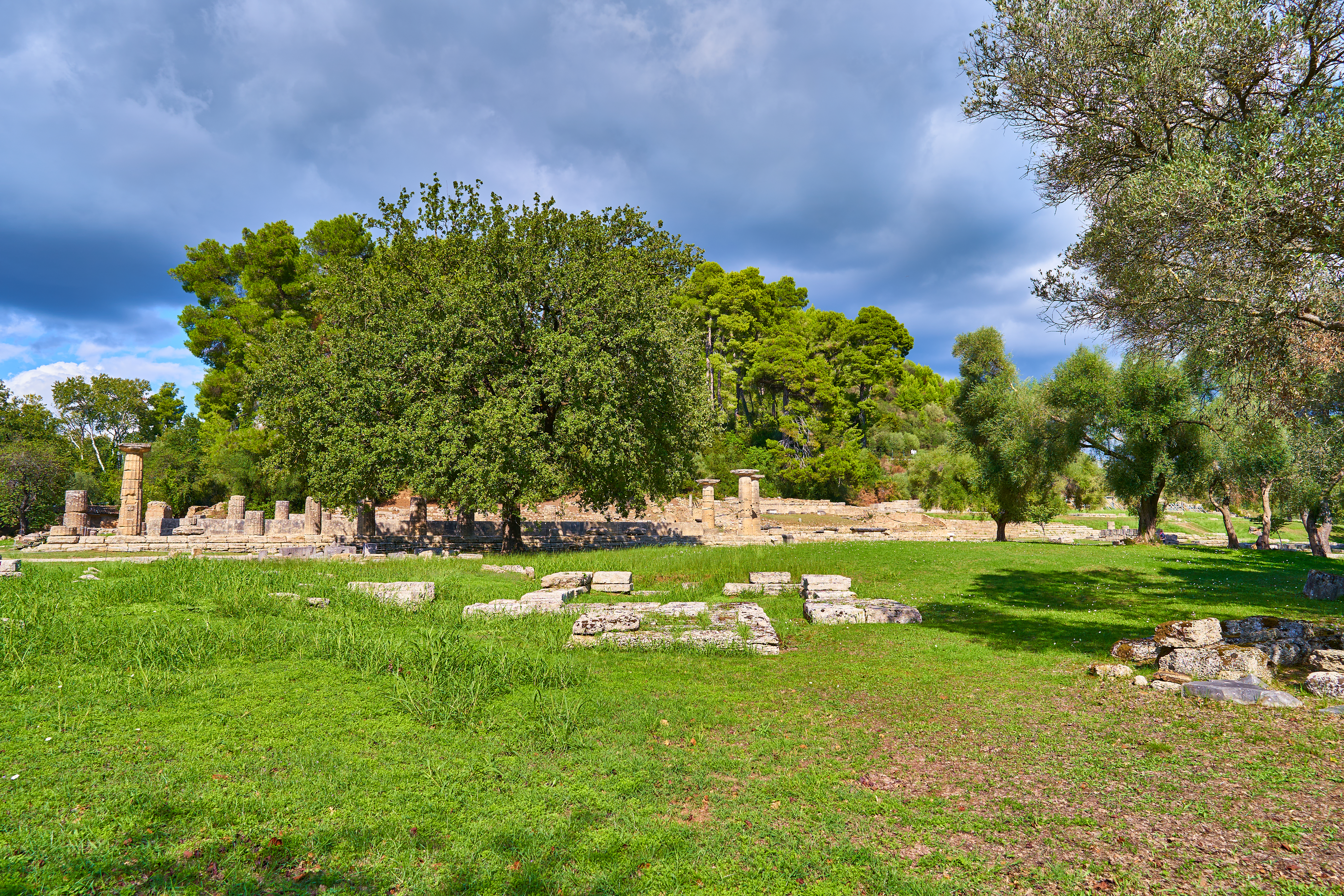
Remains of the Pelopion in Olympia

The shrine of Pelops at Olympia, the Pelopion, "drenched in glorious blood", described by Pausanias stood apart from the temple of Zeus, next to Pelops's gravesite by the ford in the river. It was enclosed with a circle of stones. Pelops was propitiated as a chthonic deity, at night with the offering of a black ram. His remains were contained in a chest near the sanctuary of Artemis Kordax (Pausanias 6.22.1), though in earlier times a gigantic shoulder blade was shown; during the Trojan War, John Tzetzes said, Pelops's shoulder-blade was brought to Troy by the Greeks because the Trojan prophet Helenus claimed the Pelopids would be able to win by doing so. Pausanias was told the full story: the shoulder-blade of Pelops was brought to Troy from Pisa, the rival of Elis; on the return, the bone was lost in a shipwreck, but afterwards recovered by a fisherman, miraculously caught in his net.

Giant-sized bones were and are often found in Greece, the remains of gigantic prehistoric animals. In ancient times there was obviously no knowledge of dinosaurs or mammoths, and such findings were believed to be actual remains of legendary heroes or demigods, and to reflect the supposedly supernatural stature of humans of the long-bygone Heroic Age. The bones' provenance was then determined according to local legends about ancient burials, with political expedience also playing a major role, helped along by convenient dreams, visions or priestly auguries.

== Gallery ==
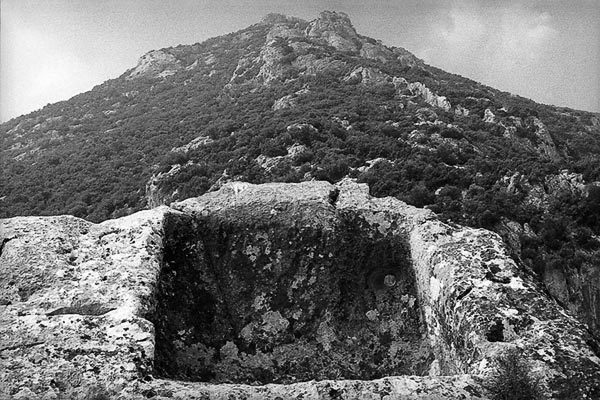
"Throne of Pelops" at Yarıkkaya locality in Mount Sipylus

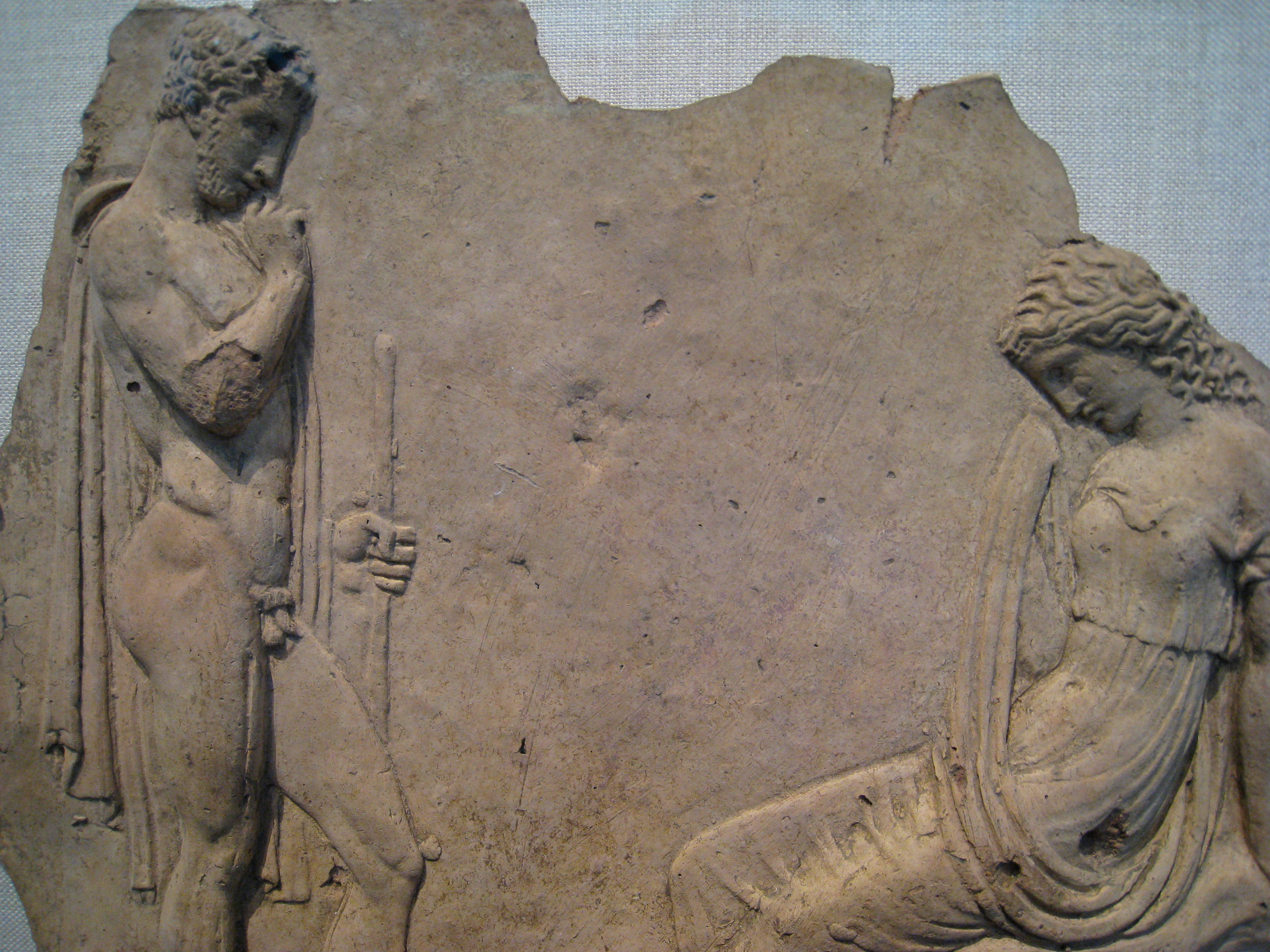
Pelops and Hippodamia; bas-relief, Metropolitan Museum of Art

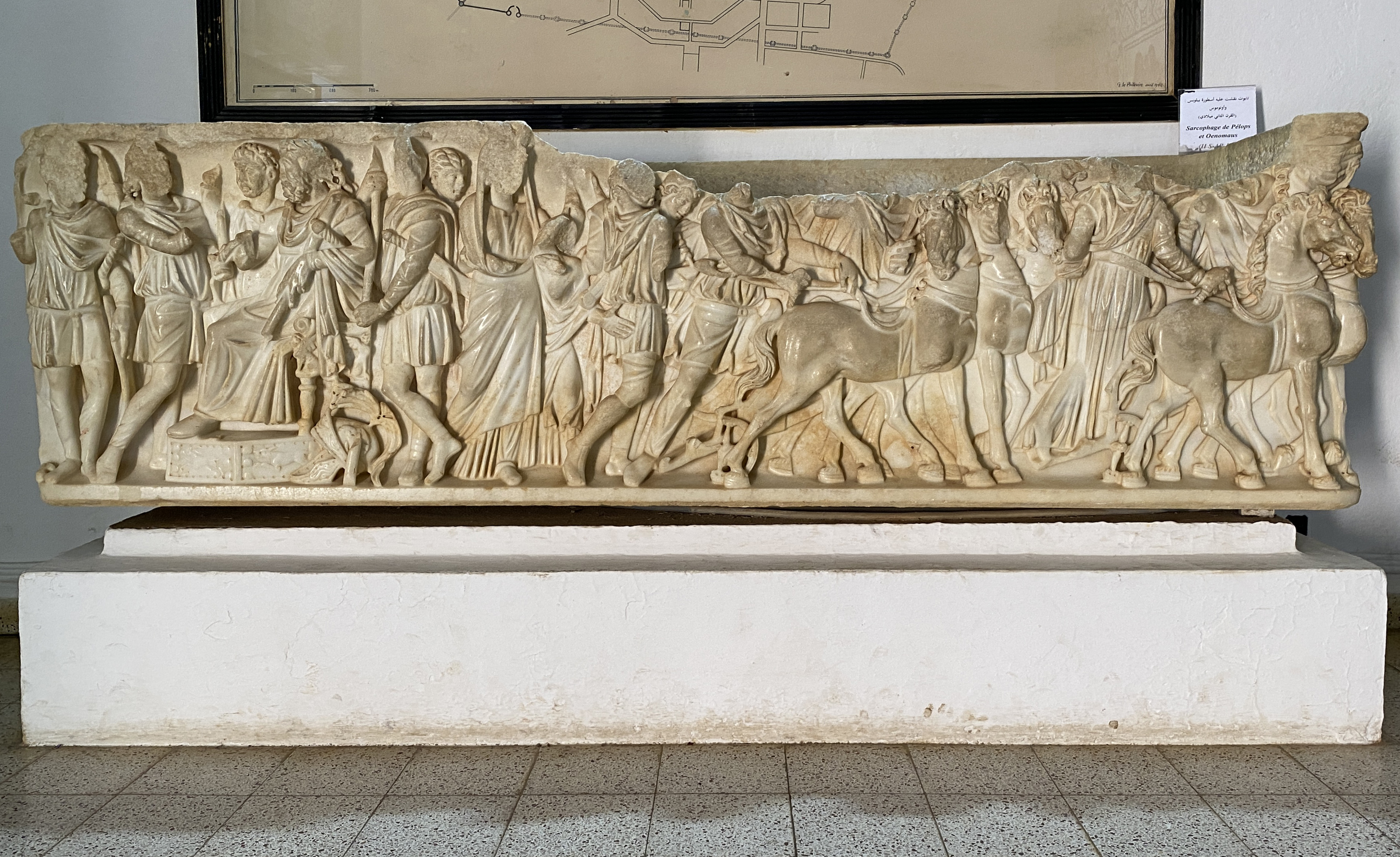
Sarcophagus of Pelops and Hippodamia, Tipaza Museum, Algeria

== See also ==
- House of Atreus
- Ancient Elis
- Mount Sipylus
- Niobe
- Nyctimus

== Ancient sources ==
- Ovid, Metamorphoses VI, 403–11
- Bibliotheca, Epitome II, 3–9; V, 10
- Pindar, Olympian Ode I
- Sophocles, Electra 504 and Oinomaos Fr. 433
- Euripides, Orestes 1024–1062
- Diodorus Siculus, Histories 4.73
- Hyginus, Fables: 84 – Oenomaus
- Pausanias, Description of Greece 5.1.3-7, 5.13.1, 6.21.9, 8.14.10-11
- Philostratus the Elder, Imagines 1.30 – Pelops
- Philostratus the Younger, Imagines 9 – Pelops

== Modern sources ==
- Burkert, Walter (1983). "Pelops at Olympia". Homo Necans. University of California Press. pp. 93–103.
- Kerenyi, Karl (1959). The Heroes of the Greeks. New York/London: Thames and Hudson.
- Patay-Horváth, András (2017). "Pelops and the Peloponnese". Orbis Terrarum, Internationale Zeitschrift für historische Geographie der Alten Welt. 15: 113–130.
- Patay-Horváth, András (2023). Transformations of Pelops: myths, monuments and cult reconsidered. London: Routledge. ISBN 9780367766986.
- Acerbo, Stefano (2022). "The εὐνομώτατος ἔρανος in Pindar O. 1.25-27 and the Myth of Pelops: A Reassessment". Mnemosyne: A Journal of Classical Studies. 75: 211–238.
- Smith, William; Dictionary of Greek and Roman Biography and Mythology, London (1873). "Pelops"
