= Taraxippus =

Greek mythological figure

In Greek mythology, the Taraxippos (Ancient Greek: Ταράξιππος; plural: taraxippoi, "horse disturber", latinized as Taraxippus; Latin equorum conturbator) was a presence, variously identified as a ghost or dangerous site, blamed for frightening horses at hippodromes throughout Greece. Some taraxippoi were associated with the Greek hero cults or with Poseidon in his aspect as a god of horses (Ancient Greek: Ποσειδῶν ἵππειοs) who brought about the death of Hippolytus. Pausanias, the ancient source offering the greatest number of explanations, regards it as an epithet rather than a single entity.

== Origin ==
The most notorious of the taraxippoi was the Taraxippos Olympios at Olympia. Pausanias describes the site:

The race-course [of Olympia] has one side longer than the other, and on the longer side, which is a bank, there stands, at the passage through the bank, Taraxippos, the terror of the horses. It is in the shape of a round altar and there the horses are seized by a strong and sudden fear for no apparent reason, and from the fear comes a disturbance. The chariots generally crash and the charioteers are injured. Therefore the drivers offer sacrifices and pray to Taraxippos to be propitious to them.

Horse- and chariot-races were a part of funeral games from the Homeric era. The use of a hero's tomb or an altar as the turning-post of a racetrack originates in rituals for the dead. In the Iliad, Achilles kills Hector in retribution for the death of his friend Patroclus, then drives his chariot around the funeral pyre three times, dragging the Trojan prince's body. This magical encircling may originally have been a binding propitiation of the dead, to assure their successful passage into the afterlife and keep them from returning.

The horse had been established as a funerary animal by the Archaic era. Commemorative art in Greece, the Etruscan civilization and ancient Rome often depicts a chariot scene or the deceased riding a horse into the afterlife. The design of the turning posts (metae) on a Roman race course was derived from Etruscan funeral monuments, and the far turn of the Circus Maximus skirted an underground altar used for the Consualia festival at which "Equestrian Neptune" (the Roman equivalent of Poseidon Hippos, Ποσειδῶν ῐ̔́πποs) was honored. The turn of a racetrack is the most likely spot for a crash, and so the natural dangers of a sharp curve combined with the sacral aura of a tomb or other religious site led to a belief in a supernatural presence. Race horses were often adorned with good-luck charms or amulets to ward off malevolence.

== Examples ==
Some said the source of terror at Olympia was the ghost of Oenomaus, harming chariot racers as he had harmed suitors of Hippodamia. Others say it was a tomb of Myrtilus, who caused the death of Oenomaus. Others said it was the tomb of an Earth-born giant, Ischenus.

At the Isthmian Games, the Taraxippos Isthmios was the ghost of Glaucus of Pontiae, who was torn apart by his own horses. The Taraxippos Nemeios caused horses to panic during the Nemean Games: "At Nemea of the Argives there was no hero who harmed the horses, but above the turning-point of the chariots rose a rock, red in color, and the flash from it terrified the horses, just as though it had been fire."

The comic playwright Aristophanes makes a joke in The Knights calling Cleon Taraxippostratus, "Disturber of the Horse Troops."
