= Pelopia (daughter of Thyestes) =

Greek mythological figure

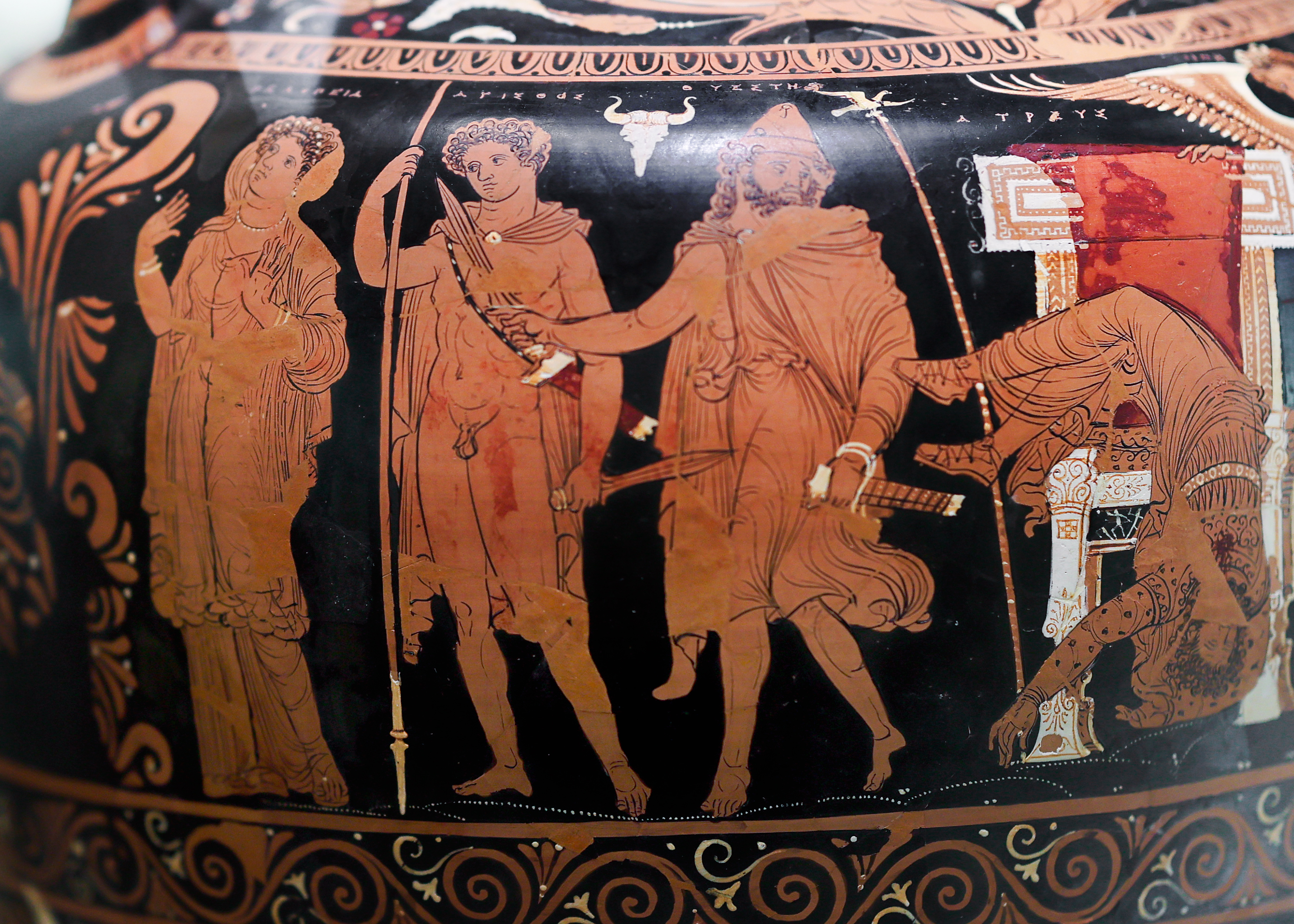
Pelopia looking away as Thyestes kill Atreus on a red-figure Apulian amphora by the Darius Painter, 4th-century BC.

In Greek mythology, Pelopia, Pelopea or Pelopeia (Ancient Greek: Πελόπεια, lit. 'belonging to Pelops' or 'created/ derived from Pelops'), less commonly known as Mnesiphane (Ancient Greek: Μνησιφάνη, romanized: Mnēsiphānē, lit. 'remembered appearance', 'revelation of memory' or 'she who appears in memory'), was the daughter of Thyestes and mother of Aegisthus.

== Mythology ==
Thyestes had been fighting with his brother, Atreus, for the throne of Mycenae for some time, as well as having an affair with Atreus' wife, Aerope. In vengeance for the affair, Atreus killed Thyestes' sons and served them to him at a banquet. Thyestes swore vengeance. An oracle then advised Thyestes that, if he had a son with his own daughter, Pelopia, that son would kill Atreus. So when Pelopia, who at the time stayed in Sicyon at the court of king Thesprotus, came to the bank of a river to wash her clothes that had been stained with blood during a sacrificial rite, Thyestes, covering his face, attacked and raped her. She managed to pull out his sword and kept it so she could recognize her offender.

Soon after that, Atreus came to Thesprotus in search of his brother and, taking Pelopia for a daughter of Thesprotus, asked for her hand, to which Thesprotus consented in order not to reveal the truth. As Pelopia had been impregnated by her father Thyestes, she soon gave birth to Aegisthus and abandoned him. He was suckled by a she-goat and survived. A shepherd found the infant Aegisthus and gave him to Atreus, who raised him as his own son. When he already entered adulthood, Thyestes was captured by Agamemnon and Menelaus at Delphi and brought to Atreus, who sent Aegisthus to kill him. Aegisthus happened to be carrying the sword that once belonged to Thyestes and was later given to him by Pelopia; Thyestes recognized the sword and asked Aegisthus about it. Aegisthus called for Pelopia, who told him how the weapon had got to her. Upon recognizing Thyestes and the fact that he was the rapist, Pelopia stabbed herself with her father's sword. Aegisthus then killed Atreus and restored the kingdom to Thyestes.
