= Parthenia =

Parthenia may refer to:

- Parthenia (music), the first printed collection of music for keyboard in England
- Parthenia (Mauretania), a town and bishopric in the Roman province of Mauretania Sitifensis
- Parthenia (Paphlagonia), a town of ancient Paphlagonia
- USS Parthenia (SP-671), a United States Navy patrol vessel in commission from 1917 to 1919 or 1920
- Parthenia (horse), a horse of the Greek mythological figure Marmax that was buried with him alongside his other horse Eripha
  - Parthenia river, a river mentioned in Greek mythology of Marmax with the river named after his similarly-named horse Parthenia
- Parthenia, an obsolete name for Euparthenia, a genus of molluscs
