= Dia (mythology) =

Set index of Greek mythological figures named Dia

Dia (/ˈdaɪ.ə/; Ancient Greek: Δία or Δῖα, romanized: Día, lit. 'heavenly', 'divine' or 'she who belongs to Zeus'), in ancient Greek religion and folklore, may refer to:

- Dia, a goddess venerated at Phlius and Sicyon. She was seen by the locals as identical to Hebe and/or Ganymeda.
- Dia, daughter of Aeolus, keeper of the winds and Telepora or Telepatra, daughter of Laestrygon. She was the sister of Androcles, Chrysippus, Iocastus, Phalacrus, Pheraemon, Xuthus, and the daughters' as Aeole, Astycrateia, Hephaestia, Iphthe and Periboea.
- Dia, daughter of King Porthaon of Calydon and mother of Thersites and possibly the remaining five sons by Agrius.
- Dia, daughter of the king Lycaon (thus sister of Callisto), mother of Dryops by Apollo. She concealed her new-born infant in a hollow oak tree.
- Dia, the Perrhaebian daughter of Deioneus or Eioneus, wife of Ixion (who killed her father so as to not pay the bride price) and with her husband, she became mother of the Lapith Pirithous, whose father in some versions was Zeus instead.
- Dia, alternate name for Hippodamia, the wife of Pirithous (thus daughter-in-law of another Dia).
- Dia, mother of Pittheus by Pelops. She may have been identical with another Hippodamia, daughter of Oenomaus.

In ancient Roman religion, Dia may refer to Dea Dia.
