= Imagines (work by Philostratus) =

Ancient Greek descriptions of paintings

Imagines (Ancient Greek: Εἰκόνες, romanized: Eikónes, lit. 'Images') is the Latin title of two works in ancient Greek by two authors, both named Philostratus, describing and explaining various artworks.

The first of these two works called Imagines consists of two books (one consisting of an introduction and 31 chapters and the other of 34 chapters) are generally attributed to Philostratus of Lemnos, or possibly to his more famous father-in-law Philostratus of Athens. Imagines ostensibly describes 65 works of art seen by Philostratus in Naples. The entire work is framed in terms of explaining art, its symbols and meaning, to a young audience. The author of the work in the introduction states that the ten-year-old son of his host was the immediate cause of the composition of this work and that the author will structure the book and each of its chapters as if this boy is being addressed.

The second Imagines (consisting of 17 chapters) is by the grandson of Philostratus of Lemnos, known as Philostratus the Younger.
