= Danais (mythology) =

Women in Greek mythology

In Greek mythology, Danais (Ancient Greek: Δαναΐς, romanized: Danaḯs) can refer to the following female figures:

- Danais, a nymph lover of Pelops who bore him a son, Chrysippus. As Pelops was already married to Hippodamia at the time, their son was illegitimate, but raised alongside his legitimate half-brothers.
- Danais (or Cressa), a Cretan nymph who bore the Curetes to the god Apollo.
- Danais, the singular form of Danaïdes, the fifty daughters of Danaus by various women.

== Bibliography ==
- John Tzetzes, Ad Lycophronem, edited by Eduard Scheer. Berlin: Weidmann publications. 1881. Internet Archive.
- Pseudo-Plutarch, Parallels, or A Comparison Between the Greek and Roman Histories in The Moralia, translations edited by William Watson Goodwin (1831-1912), from the edition of 1878, reformatted/lightly corrected by Brady Kiesling. Online version at Topos Text.
