= Copreus (herald of Eurystheus) =

Copreus with petasos and caduceus on a 400 BC Lucanian red figure pelike kept in the Museo Archeologico Nazionale della Siritide.

In Greek mythology, Copreus (Ancient Greek: Κοπρεύς, Kopreús) was King Eurystheus' herald who announced Heracles' Twelve Labours.

== Etymology ==
His name is usually translated as "dung man", or something equally unflattering. However, the name "Copreus" may originally have had more positive connotations, meaning "grazier" or "man of the land", and been associated with the ownership of cattle rather than just their dung (κόπρος).

== Mythology ==
Copreus was said to be a son of Pelops and Hippodameia. He was a fugitive from Elis where he had killed a man called Iphitus, but Eurystheus purified him of the murder. Copreus had a son named Periphetes, who features briefly in the Iliad as a well-loved warrior speared by Hector. By contrast, Copreus is disparaged by Homer:

So of a sire much baser an excellent son was begotten
better in prowess of every sort, on his feet and in battle
