= Atreus =

King of Mycenae, father of Agamemnon and Menelaus

- King of Mycenae
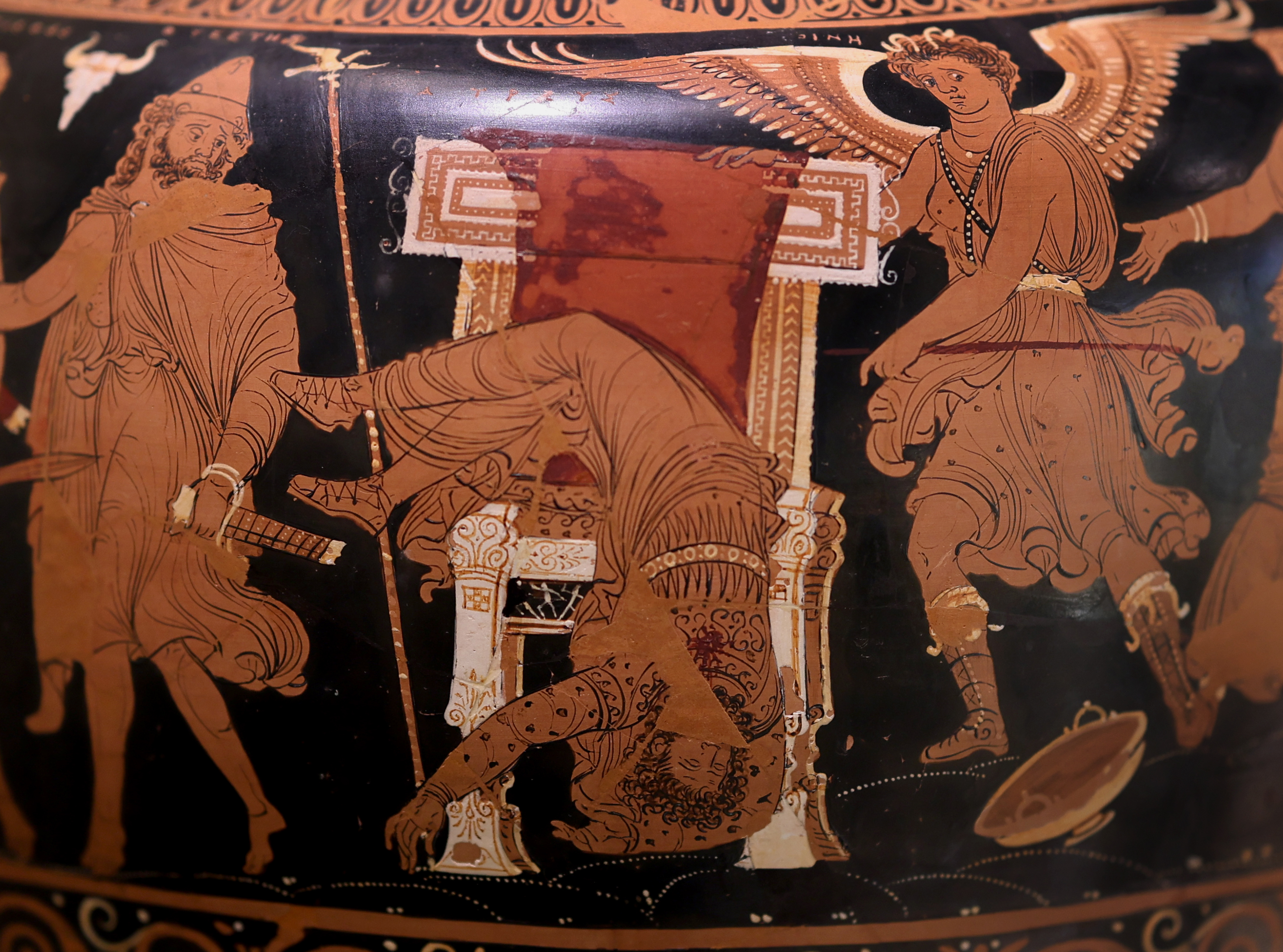
- Atreus murdered on his throne by Thyestes, 340-300 BC red-figure Apulian amphora in the National Archaeological Museum of Taranto
- Predecessor: Eurystheus
- Successor: Thyestes

Genealogy
- Parents: Pelops (father); Hippodamia (mother)
- Siblings: Thyestes, Chrysippus
- Spouse: Aerope
- Children: Agamemnon, Anaxibia, Menelaus

In Greek mythology, Atreus (Note: /ˈeɪtriəs/ AY-tri-əs, /ˈeɪtruːs/ AY-trooss;) (Ancient Greek: Ἀτρεύς, [a.trěu̯s] lit. 'fearless') (Note: From privative ἀ- (a-), "no, not" and τρέω (treō), "to tremble") was a king of Mycenae in the Peloponnese, the son of Pelops and Hippodamia, and the father of Agamemnon and Menelaus. His descendants became known collectively as the Atreidai (Note: Also rendered as Atridae or Atrids via Latin Atrīdae.) (Ancient Greek: Ἀτρείδαι Atreidai).

Atreus and his brother Thyestes were exiled by their father for murdering their half-brother Chrysippus in their desire for the throne of Olympia. They took refuge in Mycenae, where they ascended to the throne in the absence of King Eurystheus, who was fighting the Heracleidae. Eurystheus had meant for their stewardship to be temporary, but it became permanent after his death in battle, which ended the rule of the Perseid dynasty in Mycenae.

According to most ancient sources, Atreus was the father of Pleisthenes, but in some lyric poets (Ibycus, Bacchylides) Pleisthenides (son of Pleisthenes) is used as an alternative name for Atreus himself.

== Nomenclature ==
'Atreides' (Ἀτρείδης) is a patronymic form of Atreus which refers to one of his sons—Agamemnon or Menelaus. The plural forms, deriving from the Latin Atreidae, itself from Ancient Greek 'Atreidai' (Ἀτρεῖδαι), refer to both sons collectively. 'Atreides' is commonly used to translate both the singular and plural form to English. The term can also be used for the more distant descendants of Atreus, also known as the 'House of Atreus' or the 'Atreid dynasty'. It has been suggested that the name Attarsiya, belonging to an Ahhiyawan king of 1400 BC, may be the Hittite rendition of the Greek name.

== The House of Atreus ==
=== Tantalus ===
The 'House of Atreus' begins with Tantalus. Tantalus, the son of Zeus and the maiden Pluto, enjoyed cordial relations with the gods until he decided to slay his son Pelops and feed him to the gods as a test of their omniscience. Most of the gods, as they sat down to dinner with Tantalus, immediately understood what had happened, and, because they knew the nature of the meat they were served, were appalled and did not partake. But Demeter, who was distracted due to the abduction by Hades of her daughter Persephone, obliviously ate Pelops's shoulder. The gods threw Tantalus into the underworld to spend eternity standing in a pool of water beneath a fruit tree with low branches. Whenever he reaches for the fruit, the branches raise his intended meal from his grasp. Whenever he bends down to get a drink, the water recedes before he can drink. Thus is derived the word "tantalizing" in English. The gods brought Pelops back to life, replacing the bone in his shoulder with a bit of ivory with the help of Hephaestus.

=== Pelops and Hippodamia ===
Pelops

Pelops married Hippodamia after winning a chariot race against her father, King Oenomaus, by arranging for the sabotage of his would-be-father-in-law's chariot which resulted in his death, at which point the story diverges into multiple versions. The sabotage was arranged by Myrtilus, a servant of the king who was killed by Pelops for one of three reasons: 1) because he had been promised the right to take Hippodamia's virginity, which Pelops retracted; 2) because he attempted to rape her, or; 3) because Pelops did not wish to share the credit for the victory. As Myrtilus died, he cursed Pelops and his line, further adding to the house's curse.

=== Atreus and Thyestes ===
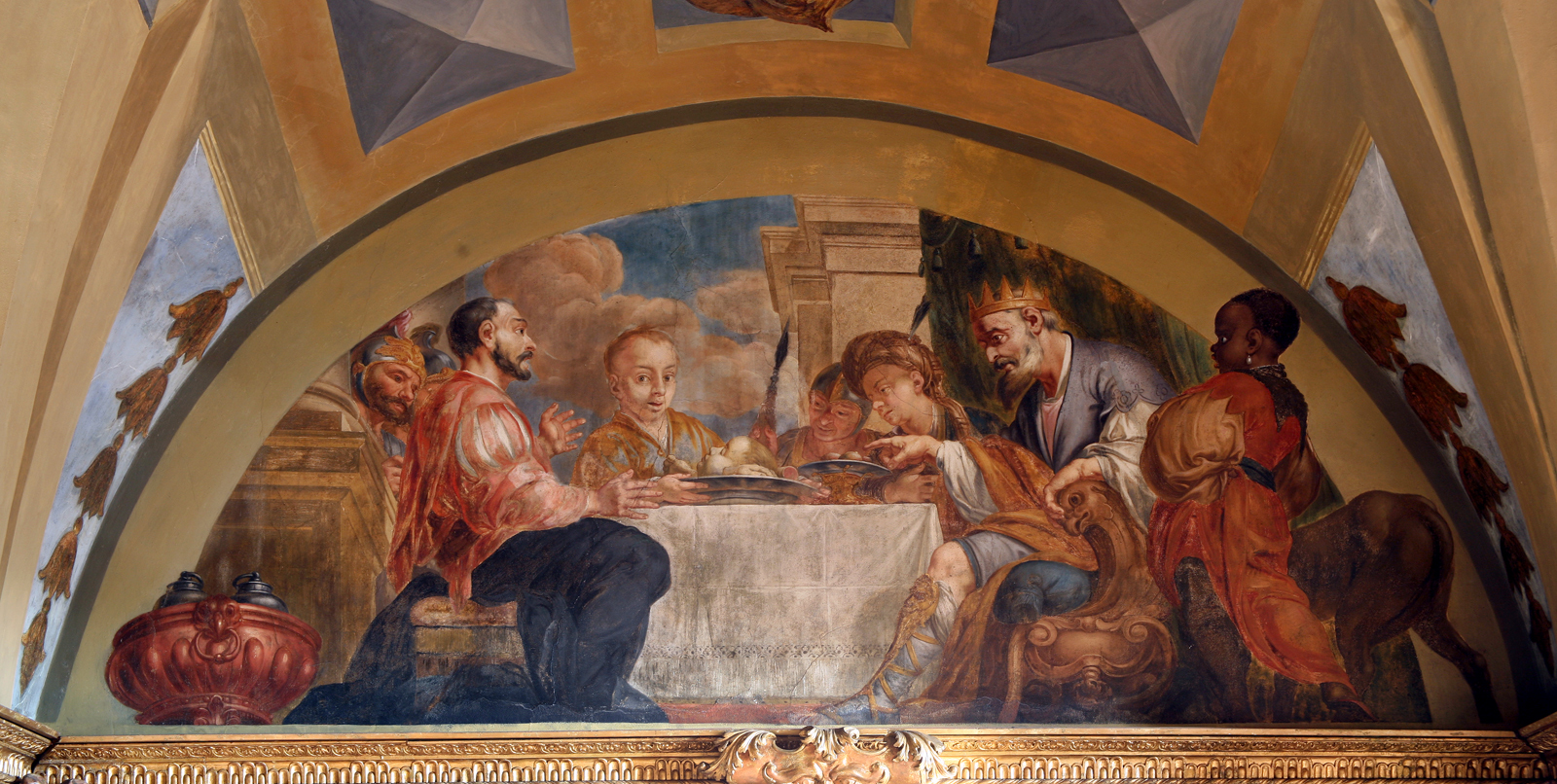
Atreus and Thyestes

Pelops and Hippodamia had many sons; two of them were Atreus and Thyestes. Depending on myth versions, they murdered Chrysippus, who was their half-brother. Because of the murder, Hippodamia, Atreus, and Thyestes were banished to Mycenae, where Hippodamia is said to have hanged herself.

Atreus vowed to sacrifice his best lamb to Artemis. Upon searching his flock, however, Atreus discovered a golden lamb which he gave to his wife, Aerope, to hide from the goddess. She gave it to Thyestes, her lover and Atreus' brother, who then persuaded Atreus to agree that whoever had the lamb should be king. Thyestes produced the lamb and claimed the throne.

Atreus retook the throne using advice he received from Zeus, who sent Hermes to him, advising him to make Thyestes agree that if the sun rose in the west and set in the east, the throne of the kingdom should be given back to Atreus. Thyestes agreed, but then Helios did exactly that, rising where he usually set and setting where he usually rose, not standing the injustice of Thyestes' usurpation. The people then bowed to the man who had managed to reverse the circuit of the Sun.

Atreus then learned of Thyestes' and Aerope's adultery and plotted revenge. He killed Thyestes' sons and cooked them, save their hands and feet. He tricked Thyestes into eating the flesh of his own sons and then taunted him with their hands and feet. (Note: This story can be found in The Libation Bearers, the second play of Aeschylus's Oresteia.) Thyestes was forced into exile for eating human flesh. Thyestes responded by asking an oracle what to do, who advised him to have a son by his daughter, Pelopia, who would then kill Atreus. However, when their son Aegisthus was first born, he was abandoned by his mother, who was ashamed of the incestuous act. A shepherd found the infant Aegisthus and gave him to Atreus, who raised him as his own son. Only as he entered adulthood did Thyestes reveal the truth to Aegisthus, that he was both father and grandfather to the boy. Aegisthus then killed Atreus, although not before Atreus and Aerope had two sons, Agamemnon and Menelaus, and a daughter Anaxibia.

=== Agamemnon and Menelaus ===
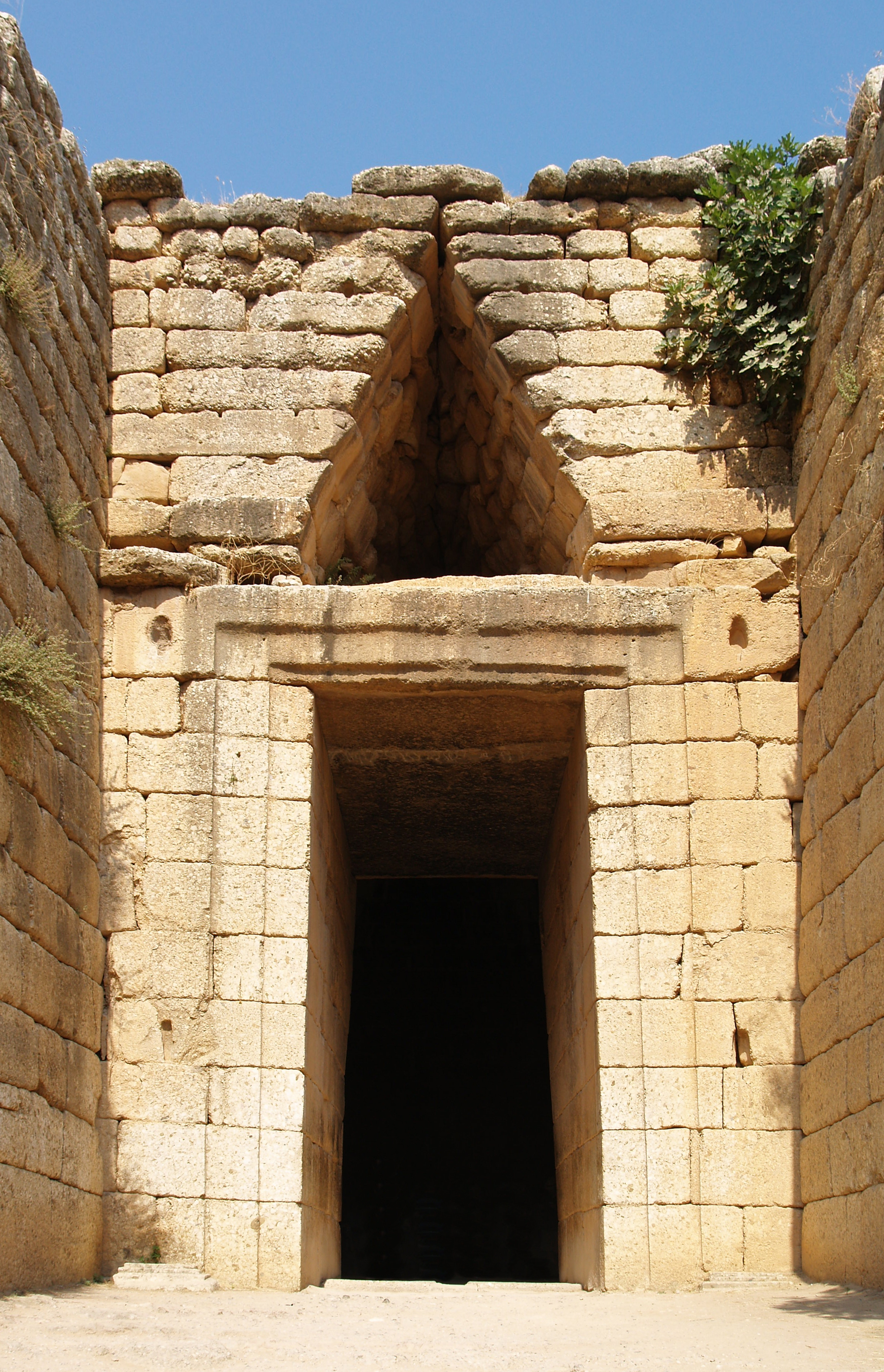
Entrance to the tholos known as the "Treasury of Atreus", built around 1250 BC.

Agamemnon married Clytemnestra, and Menelaus married Helen, her famously attractive sister. Due to the events of the Judgement of Paris, Helen later left Sparta with Paris of Troy, and Menelaus called on all of his wife's former suitors to help him take her back, officially starting the events of the Trojan War.

However, Agamemnon had angered the goddess Artemis because he had killed a sacred deer in a sacred grove, and had then boasted that he was a better hunter than she was. When the time came, Artemis stilled the winds so that Agamemnon's fleet could not sail. A prophet named Calchas told him that in order to appease Artemis, Agamemnon would have to sacrifice the most precious thing that had come to his possession in the year he killed the sacred deer. This was his first-born daughter, Iphigenia. He sent word home for her to come (in some versions of the story on the pretense that she was to be married to Achilles). Iphigenia accepted her father's choice and was honored to be a part of the war. Clytemnestra tried to stop Iphigenia but was sent away. After doing the deed, Agamemnon's fleet was able to get under way.

While he was fighting the Trojans, his wife Clytemnestra, enraged by the murder of her daughter, began an affair with Aegisthus. When Agamemnon returned home he brought with him a new concubine, the doomed prophetess, Cassandra. Upon his arrival that evening, before the great banquet she had prepared, Clytemnestra drew a bath for him and when he came out of the bath, she put the royal purple robe on him which had no opening for his head. He was confused and tangled up. Clytemnestra then stabbed him to death.

Menelaus managed to arrive safely in Sparta with his wife Helen where they were later confronted with Odysseus's son, Telemachus, during the search for his father.

=== Orestes and Electra ===
Agamemnon's only son, Orestes, was quite young when his mother killed his father. He was sent into exile. In some versions he was sent away by Clytemnestra to avoid having him present during the murder of Agamemnon; in others his sister Electra herself rescued the infant Orestes and sent him away to protect him from their mother. In both versions he was the legitimate heir apparent and as such a potential danger to his usurper uncle.

Goaded by his sister Electra, Orestes swore revenge. He knew it was his duty to avenge his father's death, but saw also that in doing so he would have to kill his mother. He was torn between avenging his father and sparing his mother. 'It was a son's duty to kill his father's murderers, a duty that came before all others. But a son who killed his mother was abhorrent to gods and to men'.

When he prayed to Apollo, the god advised him to kill his mother. Orestes realized that he must work out the curse on his house, exact vengeance and pay with his own ruin. After Orestes murdered Clytemnestra and her lover Aegisthus, he wandered the land with guilt in his heart and pursued by the Erinyes. After running away to a temple of Apollo, the sun god aided Orestes by putting the Erinyes to sleep and he quickly ran towards Athens where he pleaded to Athena. The goddess interceded although she was uncertain of how to resolve the issue and decided to leave the judgement to twelve citizens of the city with Athena presiding. This new court of justice, afterwards called the Areopagus, heard both arguments, with the Erinyes standing as the accusers and Apollo as the defence. After a round of votes, Athena had to cast a tie breaking vote and Orestes was cleared of all wrongdoings. Athena further declared that 'neither he [Orestes] nor any descendant of his would ever again be driven into evil by the irresistible power of the past.'

Thus Orestes ended the curse of the House of Atreus.

=== Tisamenus and the Hereclidae ===
Orestes married the widow Hermione, daughter of Menelaus and Helen, and she gave birth to his heir Tisamenus. It is said that Orestes also married his half-sister Erigone, daughter of Clytemnestra and Aegisthus, though it is not clear if this happened after Hermione's death or if her marriage to Orestes ended for some other reason. This last relationship produced Penthilus who would later found a city in either Lesbos or Thrace.

After the death of Orestes, Tisamenus succeeded his father to the thrones of Argos, Arcadia, Mycenae and Sparta.

However, his rule was cut short by the arrival of Heracles's descendants, the Hereclidae, who arrived in ships from Naupactus to Antirrhium, and thence to Rhium in Peloponnesus to retake the territories they saw as rightfully theirs as promised by Zeus. After a great battle, Tisamenus was slain and the doric victors divided the lands amongst them.

So ended the House of Atreus.

=== Family tree ===
House of Atreus

Tantalus
Pelops	Hippodamia
Thyestes	Atreus
Aegisthus	Agamemnon	Clytemnestra	Menelaus	Helen
Iphigeneia	Electra	Orestes	Hermione

== Classical references ==
Plato in his dialogue The Statesman tells a "famous tale" that "the sun and the stars once rose in the west, and set in the east, and that the god reversed their motion, and gave them that which they now have as a testimony to the right of Atreus." Virgil, in book IV of the Aeneid, refers to the House of Atreus and specifically Orestes in describing the death of Dido.

== Hittite records ==
There is a possible reference to Atreus in a Hittite text known as the "Indictment of Madduwatta". The indictment describes several army clashes between the Greeks and the Hittites which took place around the late 15th or early 14th centuries BC. The Greek leader was a man called Attarsiya, and some scholars have speculated that Attarsiya or Attarissiya was the Hittite way of writing the Greek name Atreus. Other scholars argue that even though the name is probably Greek (since the man is described as an Ahhiyawa) and related to Atreus, the person carrying the name is not necessarily identical to the famous Atreus.

== See also ==
- Epic Cycle
- Andromache by Euripides
- Child cannibalism
- House Atreides, a fictional Great House in Frank Herbert's Dune who claim to be descendants of this line
- Treasury of Atreus
- The Oresteia by Aeschylus
- Orestes and Electra by Euripedes
- Electra by Sophocles
- Iphigeneia in Tauris and Iphigenia at Aulis by Euripedes

== Bibliography ==
- Burkert, Walter (1972). Homo Necans. pp. 103–108.
- Carrara, Laura; Ferri, Rolando; Medda, Enrico (2023). Il mito degli Atridi dal teatro antico all'epoca contemporanea. Venice: Edizioni Ca'Foscari. ISBN 978-88-6969-736-4.
- Euripides. Electra.
- Pseudo-Apollodorus. Bibliotheca, Epitome II, 10–16.
- Sophocles. Fragments. Edited and translated by Hugh Lloyd-Jones. Loeb Classical Library 483. Cambridge, MA: Harvard University Press, 1996.

Preceded by Eurystheus	King of Mycenae	Succeeded by Thyestes
