= Thyestes =

King of Olympia and brother of Atreus in Greek mythology

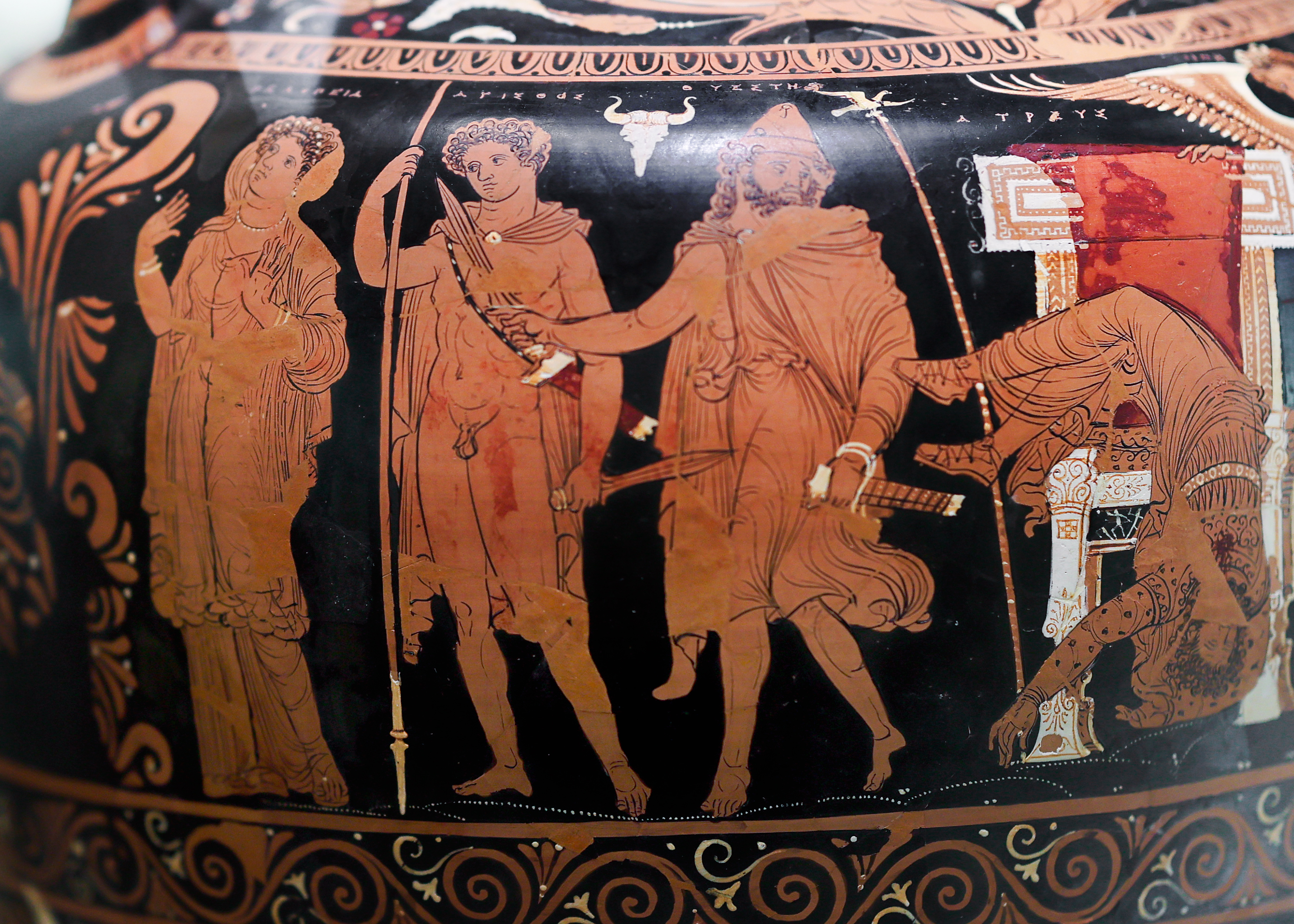
Aegisthus and Thyestes (second from right) murder Atreus on a 340–300 BC red-figure Apulian amphora in the National Archaeological Museum of Taranto.

In Greek mythology, Thyestes (Note: Pronounced /θaɪˈɛstiːz/, Ancient Greek: Θυέστης [tʰyéstɛːs] lit. 'sacrificer' or 'assailant/rager'. The name is likely derived from the Greek root thu- (θύω), meaning 'to sacrifice, to seethe' or 'to rage''.) was a king of Olympia. Thyestes and his brother, Atreus, were exiled by their father for having murdered their half-brother, Chrysippus, in their desire for the throne of Olympia. They took refuge in Mycenae, where they ascended the throne upon the absence of King Eurystheus, who was fighting the Heracleidae. Eurystheus had meant for their lordship to be temporary; it became permanent because of his death in conflict.

The most popular representation of Thyestes is that of the play Thyestes by Seneca in 62 AD. This play is one of the originals for the revenge tragedy genre. Although inspired by Greek mythology and legend, Seneca's version is different.

== Family ==
Thyestes was the son of Pelops and Hippodamia, and father of Pelopia and Aegisthus. His three sons by a naiad, who were killed by Atreus, were named Aglaus, Orchomenus and Calaeus.

== Myth ==
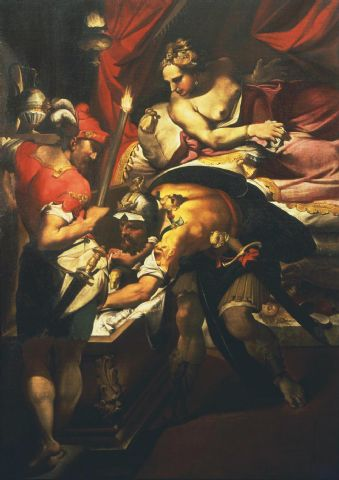
Thyestes and Aerope, painting by Nosadella.

Pelops and Hippodamia are parents to Thyestes. However, they were cursed by Myrtilus, a servant of King Oenomaus, the father of Hippodamia. Myrtilus was promised the right to Hippodamia's virginity and half of Pelops' kingdom, but Pelops denied both to him and killed him by throwing him into the sea. With his dying gasp, Myrtilus cursed their line, which is where Thyestes and Atreus come in.

Thyestes' brother and King of Mycenae, Atreus, vowed to sacrifice his best lamb to Artemis. Upon searching his flock, however, Atreus discovered a golden lamb which he gave to his wife, Aerope, to hide from the goddess. She gave it to her lover, Thyestes, who then convinced Atreus to agree that whoever had the lamb should be king. Thyestes produced the lamb and claimed the throne.

Atreus retook the throne using advice he received from the gods. Zeus sent Hermes to him, advising him to get Thyestes to agree that should the sun rise in the west and set in the east, Atreus could have his throne back. Atreus did so, and Helios reversed his normal course, in anger over Thyestes' actions.

Atreus then learned of Thyestes' and Aerope's adultery and plotted revenge. He killed Thyestes' sons and cooked them, save their hands and heads. He served Thyestes his own sons and then taunted him with their hands and heads. This is the source of modern phrase "Thyestean feast", meaning one at which human flesh is served. When Thyestes was done with his feast, he released a loud belch, which represents satiety and pleasure and his loss of self-control.

An oracle then advised Thyestes that, if he had a son with his own daughter Pelopia, that son would kill Atreus. Thyestes did so by raping Pelopia (his identity hidden from her) and the son, Aegisthus, did kill Atreus. However, when Aegisthus was first born, he was abandoned by his mother, ashamed of the origin of her son. A shepherd found the infant Aegisthus and gave him to Atreus, who raised him as his own son. Only as he entered adulthood did Thyestes reveal the truth to Aegisthus, that he was both father and grandfather to the boy and that Atreus was his uncle. Aegisthus then killed Atreus.

While Thyestes ruled Mycenae, the sons of Atreus, Agamemnon and Menelaus, were exiled to Sparta. There, King Tyndareus accepted them as the royalty that they were. Shortly after, he helped the brothers return to Mycenae to overthrow Thyestes, forcing him to live in Kythira, where he died.

=== Legacy ===
As a token of good will and allegiance, King Tyndareus offered his daughters to Agamemnon and Menelaus as wives, Clytemnestra and Helen respectively.

When Agamemnon left Mycenae for the Trojan War, Aegisthus seduced Agamemnon's wife, Clytemnestra, and the couple plotted to kill her husband upon his return. They succeeded, killing Agamemnon and his new concubine, Cassandra. Clytemnestra and Aegisthus had three children: Aletes, Erigone, and Helen who died as an infant.

Seven or eight years after the death of Agamemnon, Agamemnon's son Orestes returned to Mycenae and, with the help of his cousin Pylades and his sister Electra, killed both their mother, Clytemnestra, and Aegisthus.

Tired of the bloodshed, the gods exonerated Orestes and declared this the end of the curse on the house of Atreus, as described in Aeschylus' play The Eumenides.

However, other stories say that when Aletes and Erigone came of age and became rulers at Mycenae, Orestes returned with an army then killed his half-brother and raped his half-sister, who gave birth to a son, Penthilus.

== Theatre ==
In the first century AD, Seneca the Younger wrote a tragedy called Thyestes. In 1560 Jasper Heywood, then a Fellow of All Souls College, Oxford, published a verse translation. Shakespeare's tragedy Titus Andronicus derives some of its plot elements from the story of Thyestes. In 1681, John Crowne wrote Thyestes, A Tragedy, based closely on Seneca's Thyestes, but with the incongruous addition of a love story. Prosper Jolyot Crebillon (1674–1762) wrote a tragedy "Atree et Thyeste" (1707), which is prominent in two tales of ratiocination by Edgar Allan Poe. In 1796, Ugo Foscolo (1778–1827) wrote a tragedy called Tieste that was first presented in Venice one year later. Caryl Churchill, a British dramatist, also wrote a rendition of Thyestes. Churchill's specific translation was performed at the Royal Court Theater Upstairs in London on June 7, 1994. In 2004, Jan van Vlijmen (1935–2004) completed his opera Thyeste. The libretto was a text in French by Hugo Claus, based on his 20th century play with the same title (in Dutch: Thyestes). Thyestes appears in Ford Ainsworth's one-act play, Persephone.

Seneca's influence in literature is reflected through other works. In Arnold's Sonnet on Shakespeare, the influence of Seneca is apparent. "The reminiscence of Atreus' speech in the Thyestes of Seneca, which might subtend Cleopatra's own passionate, distended rhetoric about Antony" (Edgecombe, 257).

== References in literature ==
- Bibliotheca, Epitome 2.10–2.15
- Hyginus, Fabulae, 85: Chrysippus, 86: Sons of Pelops, 88: Atreus
- Aeschylus' Agamemnon
- Edgar Allan Poe, The Purloined Letter, 140
- Milton, Paradise Lost, book 10, lines 687–691

== See also ==
- Child cannibalism
- Demophon of Elaeus
- Polytechnus
- Tereus
