= Pittheus =

Son of Pelops in Greek mythology

In Greek mythology, Pittheus (/ˈpɪθ.juːs/; Ancient Greek: Πιτθεύς) was the king of Troezen, city in Argolis, which he had named after his brother Troezen.

== Biography ==
Pittheus was a son of Pelops and Dia (maybe another name for Hippodamia), father of Aethra and Henioche, and grandfather and instructor of Theseus.

He was described by Euripides as the most pious son of Pelops, a wise man, and well versed on understanding the oracle thus sought by Aegeus. Pittheus is said to have taught the art of speaking, and even to have written a book upon it. Plutarch spoke of Pittheus's account in the following verses:

[Pittheus] had the highest repute as a man versed in the lore of his times and of the greatest wisdom. Now the wisdom of that day had some such form and force as that for which Hesiod was famous, especially in the sententious maxims of his 'Works and Days' .One of these maxims is ascribed to Pittheus, namely: — 'Payment pledged to a man who is dear must be ample and certain.' At any rate, this is what Aristotle the philosopher says, and Euripides, when he has Hippolytus addressed as 'nursling of the pure and holy Pittheus,' shows what the world thought of Pittheus.

== Mythology ==
=== Early life ===
Pelops was the strongest of the kings in Peloponnesus quite as much on account of the number of his children as the amount of his wealth. He gave many daughters in marriage to men of the highest rank, and scattered many sons among the cities as their rulers. Coming from the district of Pisatis in Elis, Pittheus and his brother Troezen were received by Aetius, son of Anthas. This Anthas was a brother of Hyperenor and the two were sons of Poseidon and Pleiad Alcyone, both reigned in Hyperea and Anthea before Aetius.

The Pelopids settled in the country and divided the power with Aetius. Thus, after these events the land was ruled by three kings instead of one: Aetius, Troezen and Pittheus but the newcomers enjoyed the real authority. This was evident after Troezen's death for Pittheus who supplanted the earlier dynasty, ruled as the sole king. Having gathered settlers together and joining the two villages of Hyperea and Anthea into a modern city, Pittheus renamed it Troezen after his sibling.

Bellerophon came to Troezen to ask Pittheus for Aethra's hand in marriage, but the hero was banished from Corinth before the nuptials took place.

=== Childless Aegeus ===
King Aegeus of Athens reigned at the same time with Pittheus in Troezen. He was childless with his previous marriages and thus desired to have his own heirs. After he received from the Pythian priestess the celebrated oracle in which she bade him to have intercourse with no woman until he came to Athens. But Aegeus thought the words of the command somewhat obscure, and therefore turned aside to Troezen and asked for Pittheus's advice pertaining the words of the god, which ran as follows: — 'Loose not the wine-skin's jutting neck, great chief of the people, Until thou shalt have come once more to the city of Athens.'

Pittheus understanding the oracle on Aegeus's inquiry whether or not he was going to ever have children, had made the Athenian king drunk, who ended up spending the night with his daughter Aethra. Aethra had lain with Poseidon earlier that evening, so when Theseus was born he became Aegeus's stepson. According to Plutarch, Pittheus merely spread the report of her daughter's copulation with the god so that Theseus might be regarded as the son of Poseidon, who was much revered at Troezen.

=== Two heroes ===
A Troezenian legend of the earliest notable event of Theseus's life is set in the house of Pittheus. After he had finished his labours, Heracles came to visit Pittheus. He laid his lion-skin down on a couch where it sat in a most lifelike fashion. A little while later Theseus, who was seven years old at this time, came into the room with some of his schoolmates. When the other children saw the skin of the Nemean lion, they ran from it in terror, thinking that it was alive. However, Theseus remained in the room, grabbed an axe from a nearby guard, and attacked the lion-skin.

When Heracles became slave of Omphale in Lydia, villains burst forth and broke in the regions of Hellas because no one would rebuke and restrain them. The journey was therefore a perilous one for travelers by land from Peloponnesus to Athens, and Pittheus, by describing each of the miscreants at length, what sort of a monster he was, and what deeds he wrought upon strangers, tried to persuade Theseus to make his journey by sea. But the hero, secretly inspired by the valor of his cousin Heracles, paid no heed of his grandfather's warnings, traveled by the road and eventually cleared it from brigands and bandits that infested it.

=== Misfortune of Hippolytus ===
Pittheus also appeared in the myth about Hippolytos, son of Theseus and thus Pittheus's great-grandson. When Theseus, now king of Athens, married Phaedra, he sent Hippolytos to the house of Pittheus, who became his pupil and raised him as heir to the Troezen throne. However, Hippolytos later got killed by Poseidon when his father was led to believe he violated Phaedra and caused her to commit suicide.

Pittheus's tomb and the chair on which he had sat in judgment were shown at Troezene down to a late time.

== Source ==
- William Smith. A Dictionary of Greek and Roman biography and mythology. s.v. Pittheus. London (1848).
- Charlton T. Lewis & Charles Short. A Latin Dictionary. s.v. Pittheus. Oxford. Clarendon Press (1879).
- Harry Thurston Peck. Harpers Dictionary of Classical Antiquities. s.v. Pittheus. New York. Harper and Brothers (1898).
