= Nicippe =

Women name in Greek mythology

Nicippe, also Nikippe (Ancient Greek: Νικίππη, romanized: Nikíppē, lit. 'victorious mare') is a name attributed to several women in Greek mythology.

- Nicippe, a priestess of Demeter in Dotion, Thessaly. Demeter assumes her shape to try to stop Erysichthon from cutting down the sacred grove.
- Nicippe, a Pisatian princess as daughter of King Pelops and Hippodamia, daughter of the earlier king Oenomaus. She became queen of Mycenae after marrying King Sthenelus by whom she bore Alcyone, Medusa (Astymedusa) and Eurystheus. Nicippe was also known as Antibia or Amphibia (Ἀμφιβίαν) or Archippe.
- Nicippe, a Thespian princess as one of the 50 daughters of King Thespius and Megamede or by one of his many wives. When Heracles hunted and ultimately slayed the Cithaeronian lion, Nicippe with her other sisters, except for one, all laid with the hero in a night, a week or for 50 days as what their father strongly desired it to be. Nicippe bore Heracles a son, Antimachus.

Also known is one apparently historical figure of this name:

- Nicippe, daughter of Paseas, who dedicated a statue to Aphrodite Symmachia at the temple in Mantinea which was founded to commemorate the alliance of the Mantineans with the Romans in the Battle of Actium.
