= Marmax =

In Greek mythology, Marmax (Ancient Greek: Μάρμαξ) was one of the suitors of Hippodameia, who was slain by Oenomaus, and was buried with his two horses, Parthenia and Eripha.

== Mythology ==
The geographer Pausanias recounted the account of Marmax.

"Going on from this point you come to the water of Parthenia, and by the river is the grave of the mares of Marmax. The story has it that this Marmax was the first suitor of Hippodameia to arrive, and that he was killed by Oenomaus before the others; that the names of his mares were Parthenia and Eripha; that Oenomaus slew the mares after Marmax, but granted burial to them also, and that the river received the name Parthenia from the mare of Marmax."
