= Philostratus of Lemnos =

3rd century Greek sophist and author

Philostratus of Lemnos (Ancient Greek: Φιλόστρατος ὁ Λήμνιος; c. 190 – c. 230 AD), also known as Philostratus the Elder to distinguish him from Philostratus the Younger who was also from Lemnos, was a Greek sophist of the Roman imperial period. He was probably a nephew of the sophist Philostratus of Athens, and is credited with two books formerly attributed to his uncle.

== Works ==
Eikones (Εἰκόνες, Images or Imagines) is ostensibly a description of 64 pictures in a Neapolitan gallery. Goethe, Welcker, Brunn, E. Bertrand and Helbig, among others, have held that the descriptions are of actually existing works of art, while Heyne and Friederichs deny this. In any case they are interesting as showing the way in which ancient artists treated mythological and other subjects, and are written with artistic knowledge and in attractive language. A second series of Imagines was produced by his grandson.

Philostratus the Younger certainly wrote the 2nd series of Eikones and in the foreword, thanked Philostratus the Elder for the 1st series so eventually attributed to him instead of Philostratus of Athens as previously attributed.

Heroicus, or On Heroes, is a popular disquisition on the heroes of the Trojan War. Written in the form of a conversation between a Thracian vine-dresser on the shore of the Hellespont and a Phoenician merchant who derives his knowledge from the hero Protesilaus, Palamedes is exalted at the expense of Odysseus, and Homer's unfairness to him is attacked. It has been suggested that Philostratus is here describing a series of heroic paintings in the palace of Julia Domna.

The work Heroicus traditionally attributed to Philostratus of Athens, but is now more commonly attributed to this Philostratus.

== Sources ==
- Côté, Dominique. "La figure d’Eschine dans les Vies des sophistes de Philostrate", Cahiers des études anciennes 42 (2005), p. 389-420.
- Côté, Dominique. "Les deux sophistiques de Philostrate", Rhetorica 24 (2006), 1-35.
