= Philostratus the Younger =

Greek sophist of the Roman imperial period

Philostratus the Younger (Ancient Greek: Φιλόστρατος ὁ Νεώτερος; fl. 3rd century AD), also known as Philostratus of Lemnos, was a Greek sophist of the Roman imperial period. He was author of the second series of Imagines, which does not survive completely; in the preface, he praises his mother's father, who wrote the first series of Imagines; this is presumably the author more commonly referred to as Philostratus of Lemnos, who himself was the son-in-law of the famous sophist Philostratus of Athens. The dating of this work, the only known activity of its author, varies between 250 and 300 AD; if the earlier date is correct, this Philostratus may well be the same man who was archon of Athens in 255 AD.
