= Hippodamia (daughter of Oenomaus) =

Greek mythological figure

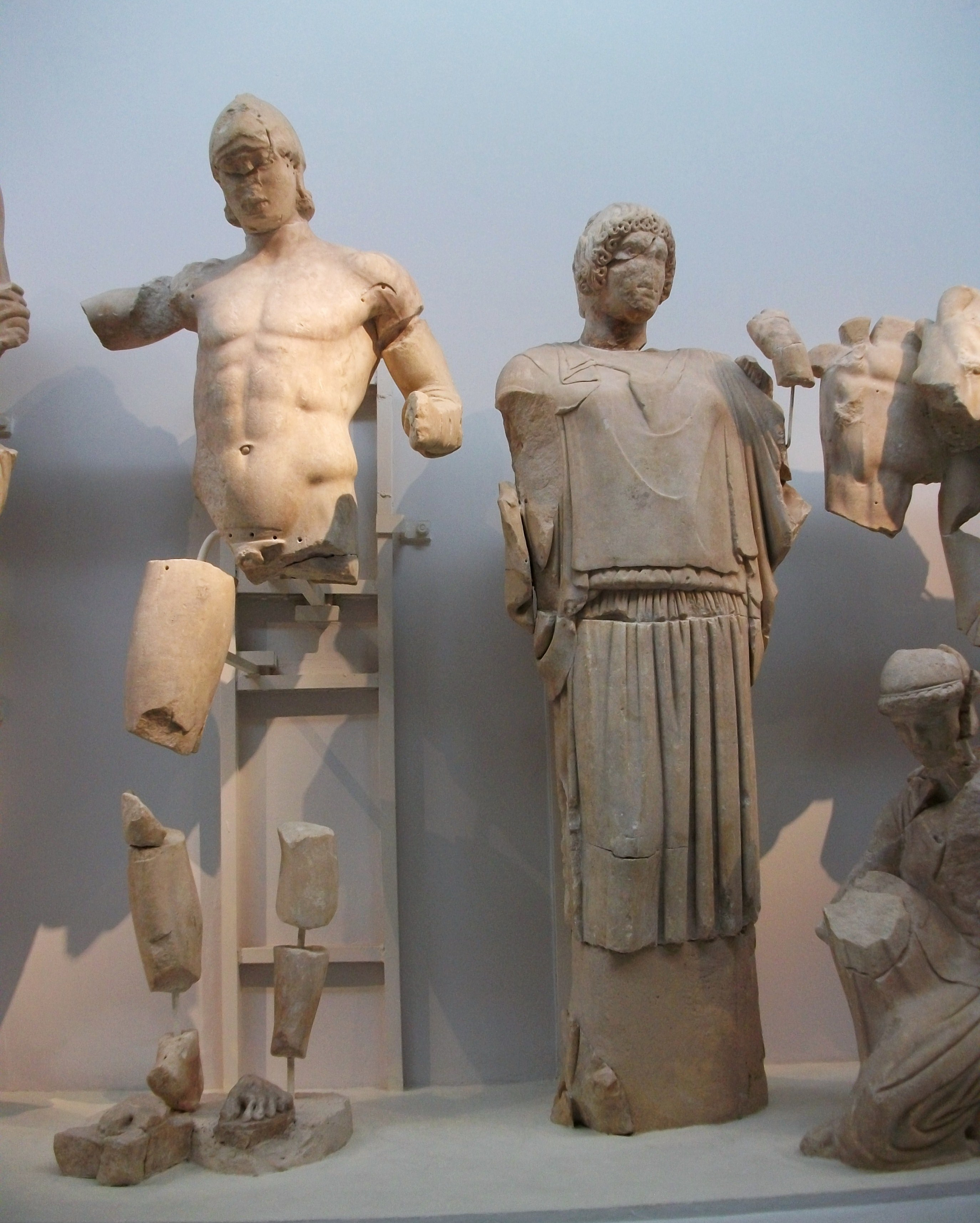
Pelops and Hippodamia from the east pediment of the Temple of Zeus in Olympia.

Hippodamia (/ˌhɪpoʊdəˈmaɪ.ə/, /hɪˌpɒdə-/; also Hippodamea and Hippodameia; Ancient Greek: Ἱπποδάμεια "she who masters horses" derived from ἵππος hippos "horse" and δαμάζειν damazein "to tame") was a Greek mythological figure, the daughter of Oenomaus. She was the queen of Pisa, Greece and the wife of Pelops, appearing with Pelops at a potential cult site in Ancient Olympia.

== Family ==
Hippodamia was the daughter of King Oenomaus of Pisa either by Sterope, daughter of Atlas and Pleione, Evarete, daughter of Acrisius and Eurydice, or Eurythoe, daughter of Danaus. She was probably the sister of Leucippus and Alcippe, wife of Evenus and mother of Marpessa.

Hippodamia married Pelops, son of King Tantalus of Lydia, and their children are as follows: Astydameia, Atreus, Copreus, Dias, Eurydice, Hippalcimus, Hippasus, Lysidice, Mytilene, Nicippe, Pittheus, Thyestes, and Troezen.

== Mythology ==
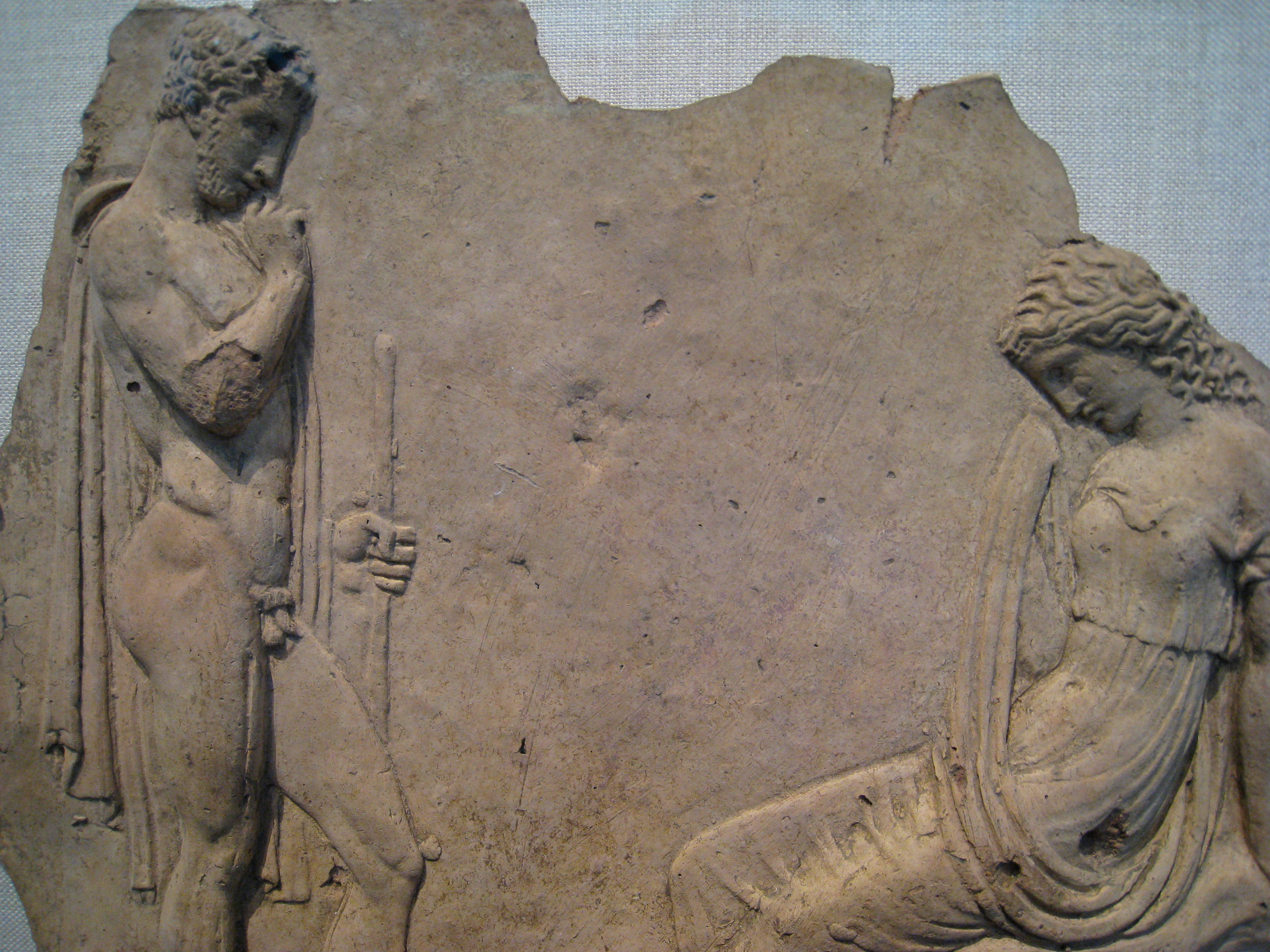
This bas relief, made in the Roman Empire, depicts Pelops (left) and Hippodamia (right) likely communicating after the chariot race.

Hippodamia's father, King Oenomaus of Pisa, was fearful of a prophecy that claimed he would be killed by his son-in-law. So when suitors arrived, he told them they could marry his daughter only if they defeated him in a chariot race, and if they lost, they would be executed. Eighteen suitors of Hippodamia had perished in this way, and Oenamaus had affixed their heads to the wooden columns of his palace. Pausanias was shown what was purported to be the last standing column in the late second century CE; the same author mentions that Pelops erected a monument in honor of all the suitors before himself, and enlists their names, which are as follows:

- Marmax
- Alcathous, son of Porthaon
- Euryalus
- Eurymachus
- Crotalus
- Acrias of Lacedaemon, founder of Acriae
- Capetus
- Lycurgus
- Lasius
- Chalcodon
- Tricolonus
- Aristomachus
- Prias
- Pelagon
- Aeolus
- Cronius
- Erythras, son of Leucon
- Eioneus, son of Magnes

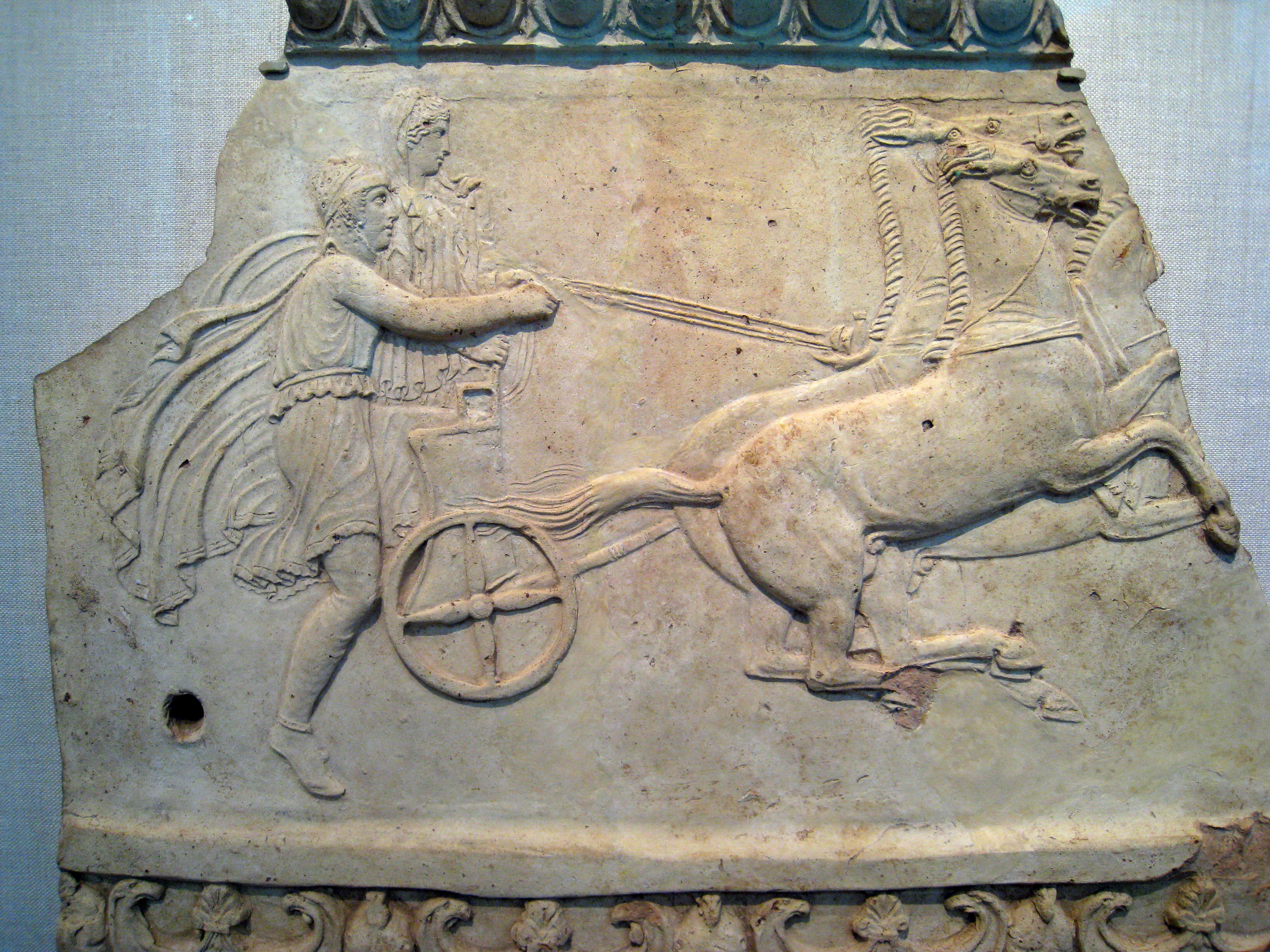
Made during Rome's Julio-Claudian era of 27 BCE-68 CE, this terracotta relief shows Pelops (in front) with Hippodamia (in back) riding a chariot.

Pelops, son of King Tantalus of Lydia, came to ask for Hippodamia's hand in marriage and prepared to race Oenomaus. Worried about losing, Pelops went to the seaside and invoked Poseidon, his former lover. Reminding Poseidon of their love ("Aphrodite's sweet gifts"), he asked Poseidon for help. Smiling, Poseidon caused a chariot drawn by winged horses to appear.

In an episode that was added to the simple heroic chariot race, Pelops, still unsure of his fate, convinced Oenomaus's charioteer, Myrtilus, a son of Hermes, to help him win. Myrtilus agreed to Pelops' wishes as Pelops promised him half of Oenomaus' kingdom and the first night in bed with Hippodamia. The night before the race, while Myrtilus was putting Oenomaus's chariot together, he replaced the bronze linchpins attaching the wheels to the chariot axle with fake ones made of beeswax. The race began, and went on for a long time but just as Oenomaus was catching up to Pelops and readying to kill him, the wheels flew off and the chariot broke apart. Myrtilus survived, but Oenomaus was dragged to death by his horses.

When Myrtilus tried to claim his reward and lay with Hippodamia, Pelops killed Myrtilus by throwing him off a cliff into the sea. As Myrtilus died, he cursed Pelops and Hippodamia. Although this curse didn't affect Pelops and Hippodamia's prosperity, as they came to have fourteen children, the curse was enacted and haunted Hippodamia and Pelops' children Atreus and Thyestes as well as their descendants Agamemnon, Aegisthus, Menelaus and Orestes.

== Olympia ==
The first cult site of Hippodamia and Pelops appeared in Olympia, called the Hippodameion. The true location of the Hippodameion remains unknown, yet the time period is thought to be during the Late Helladic period. It was thought that the Hippodameion was located near the sacred groves within Olympia, known as the Altis, yet some historians dispute this. The Hippodameion likely contained items similar to other cults that showed up around the time period, including statues of Pelops and Hippodamia along with terracotta pots depicting their stories.

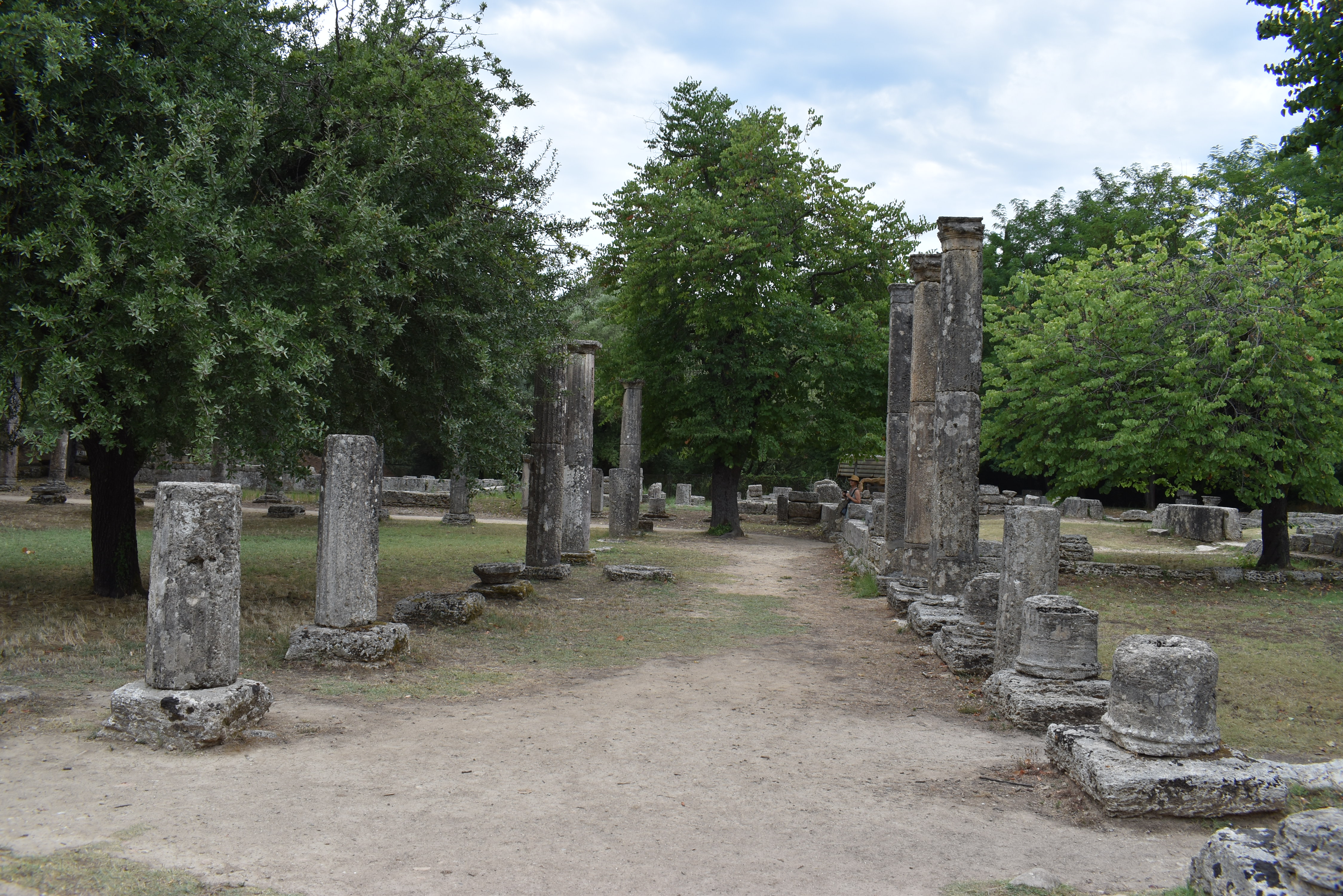
Part of the Altis within Ancient Greece, these pillars were made of local stones, such as limestone.

Walter Burkert notes that though the story of the contest for Hippodamia's hand figures in the Hesiodic Megalai Ehoiai and on the chest of Cypselus (ca. 570 BCE) that was conserved at Olympia, and though preparations for the chariot-race figured in the east pediment of the great temple of Zeus at Olympia, the myth of the chariot race only became important at Olympia with the introduction of chariot racing in the twenty-fifth Olympiad (680 BCE). Georges Devereux connected the "courtship" of Hippodamia with animal husbandry taboos of Elis, and the influence of Elis at Olympia that grew in the seventh century.

An asteroid discovered in 1901 was named in honor of Hippodamia.

== See also ==
- Heraean Games
- Theseus saving Hippodamia, 1908 sculpture
