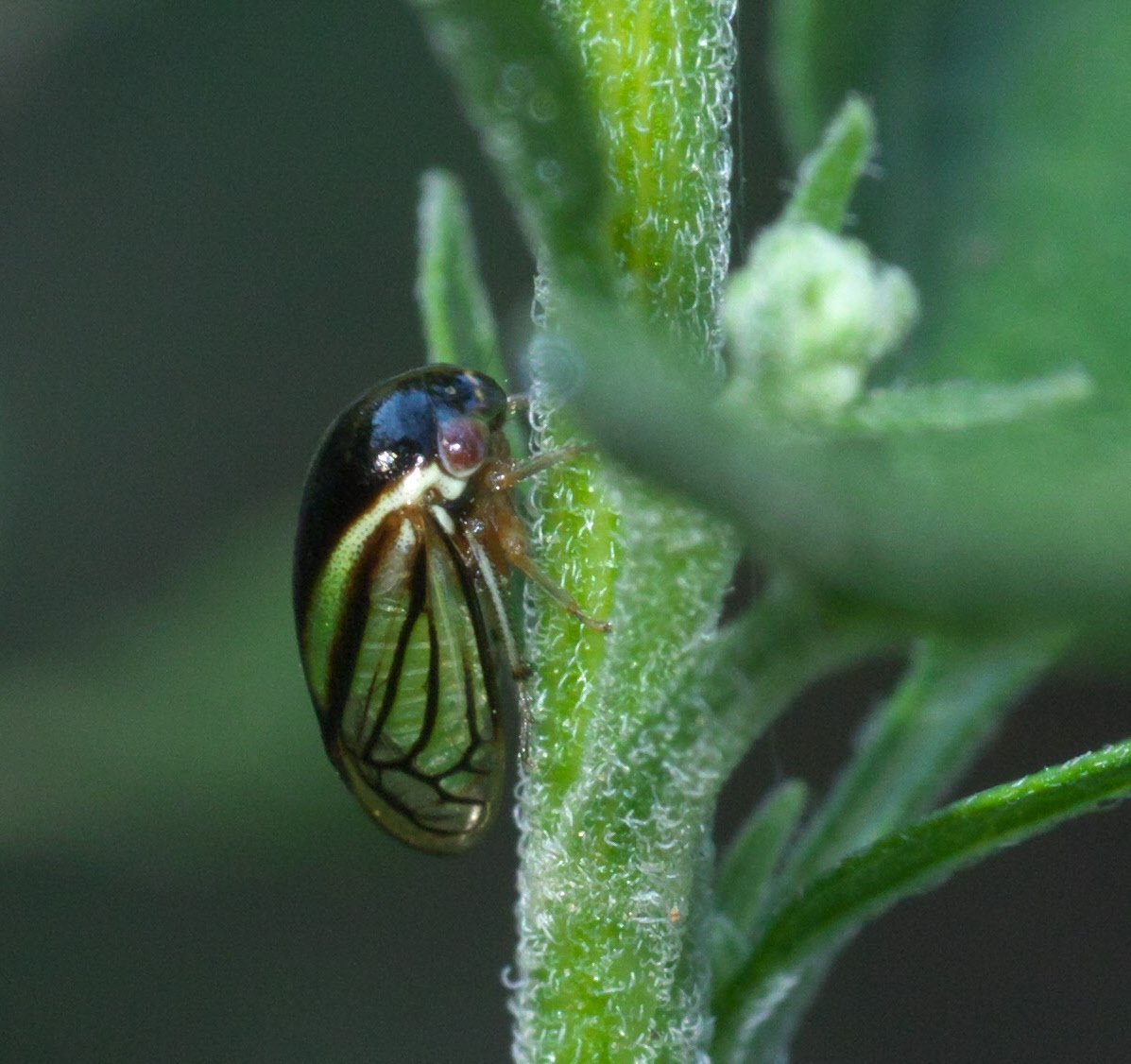
- Acutalis tartarea

Scientific classification
- Kingdom: Animalia
- Phylum: Arthropoda
- Clade: Pancrustacea
- Class: Insecta
- Order: Hemiptera
- Suborder: Auchenorrhyncha
- Family: Membracidae
- Subfamily: Smiliinae; Stål, 1866

= Smiliinae =

Subfamily of treehoppers

Smiliinae is a subfamily of treehoppers in the family Membracidae. These are bugs and include about 100 genera (and 4 unorganized genera) in 10 tribes, most which are found in the Americas, with the exception of the tribe Ceresini which has Palaearctic representatives.

== Tribes and genera ==
These genera belong to the subfamily Smiliinae:

incertae sedis

1. Antianthe Fowler, 1895
2. Hemicardiacus Plummer, 1945
3. Smilirhexia McKamey, 2008
4. Tropidarnis Fowler, 1894

=== Acutalini ===
Authority: Fowler, 1895

1. Acutalis Fairmaire, 1846
2. Bordoniana Sakakibara, 1999
3. Cornutalis Sakakibara, 1998
4. Euritea Stål, 1867
5. Thrasymedes Kirkaldy, 1904

Amastrini Goding, 1926

1. Amastris Stål, 1862
2. Aurimastris Evangelista and Sakakibara, 2007
3. Bajulata Ball, 1933
4. Erosne Stål, 1867
5. Harmonides Kirkaldy, 1902
6. Hygris Stål, 1862
7. Idioderma Van Duzee, 1909
8. Lallemandia Funkhouser, 1922
9. Neotynelia Creão-Duarte and Sakakibara, 2000
10. Tynelia Stål, 1858
11. Vanduzea Goding, 1892

=== Ceresini ===
Authority: Goding, 1892

1. Amblyophallus Kopp and Yonke, 1979
2. Anisostylus Caldwell, 1949
3. Antonae Stål, 1867
4. Ceresa Amyot and Serville, 1843
5. Clepsydrius Fowler, 1895
6. Cyphonia Laporte, 1832
7. Eucyphonia Sakakibara, 1968
8. Hadrophallus Kopp and Yonke, 1979
9. Ilithucia Stål, 1867
10. Melusinella Metcalf, 1965
11. Paraceresa Kopp and Yonke, 1979
12. Parantonae Fowler, 1895
13. Poppea Stål, 1867
14. Proxolonia Sakakibara, 1969
15. Spissistilus Caldwell, 1949
16. Stictocephala Stål, 1869
17. Stictolobus Metcalf, 1916
18. Tapinolobus Sakakibara, 1969
19. Tortistilus Caldwell, 1949
20. Trichaetipyga Caldwell, 1949
21. Vestistiloides Andrade, 2003
22. Vestistilus Caldwell, 1949

=== Micrutalini ===
Authority: Haupt, 1929

1. Micrutalis Fowler, 1895
2. Trachytalis Fowler, 1895

=== Polyglyptini ===
Authority: Goding, 1892

1. Adippe Stål, 1867
2. Aphetea Fowler, 1895
3. Bilimekia Fowler, 1895
4. Bryantopsis Ball, 1937
5. Creonus Sakakibara, 1996
6. Dioclophara Kirkaldy, 1904
7. Ennya Stål, 1866
8. Entylia Germar, 1833
9. Gelastogonia Kirkaldy, 1904
10. Hemiptycha Germar, 1833
11. Heranice Stål, 1867
12. Maturnaria Metcalf, 1952
13. Membracidoidea Goding, 1929
14. Mendicea Goding, 1926
15. Metheisa Fowler, 1896
16. Notogonioides McKamey, 1997
17. Paraphetea Sakakibara and Creão-Duarte, 2000
18. Phormophora Stål, 1869
19. Polyglypta Burmeister, 1835
20. Polyglyptodes Fowler, 1895
21. Publilia Stål, 1866
22. Ramedia Creão-Duarte and Sakakibara, 1989
23. Sturmella Spinola, 1850
- tribe Quadrinareini Deitz, 1975
  - Quadrinarea Goding, 1927
- tribe Smiliini Stål, 1866
  - Ashmeadea Goding, 1892
  - Atymna Stål, 1867
  - Atymnina Plummer, 1938
  - Cyrtolobus Goding, 1892
  - Godingia Fowler, 1896
  - Grandolobus Ball, 1932
  - Ophiderma Fairmaire, 1846
  - Smilia Germar, 1833
  - Xantholobus Van Duzee, 1908
- tribe Telamonini Goding, 1892
  - Archasia Stål, 1867
  - Carynota Fitch, 1851
  - Glossonotus Butler, 1877
  - Heliria Stål, 1867
  - Palonica Ball, 1931
  - Telamona Fitch, 1851
  - Telamonanthe Baker, 1907
  - Telonaca Ball, 1918
  - Thelia Amyot and Serville, 1843
- tribe Thuridini Deitz, 1975
  - Flynnia McKamey, 2017
  - Thuris Funkhouser, 1943
- tribe Tragopini Stål, 1866
  - Anobilia Tode, 1966
  - Chelyoidea Buckton, 1902
  - Colisicostata McKamey, 1994
  - Horiola Fairmaire, 1846
  - Stilbophora Stål, 1869
  - Todea McKamey, 1994
  - Tragopa Latreille, 1829
  - Tropidolomia Stål, 1869
