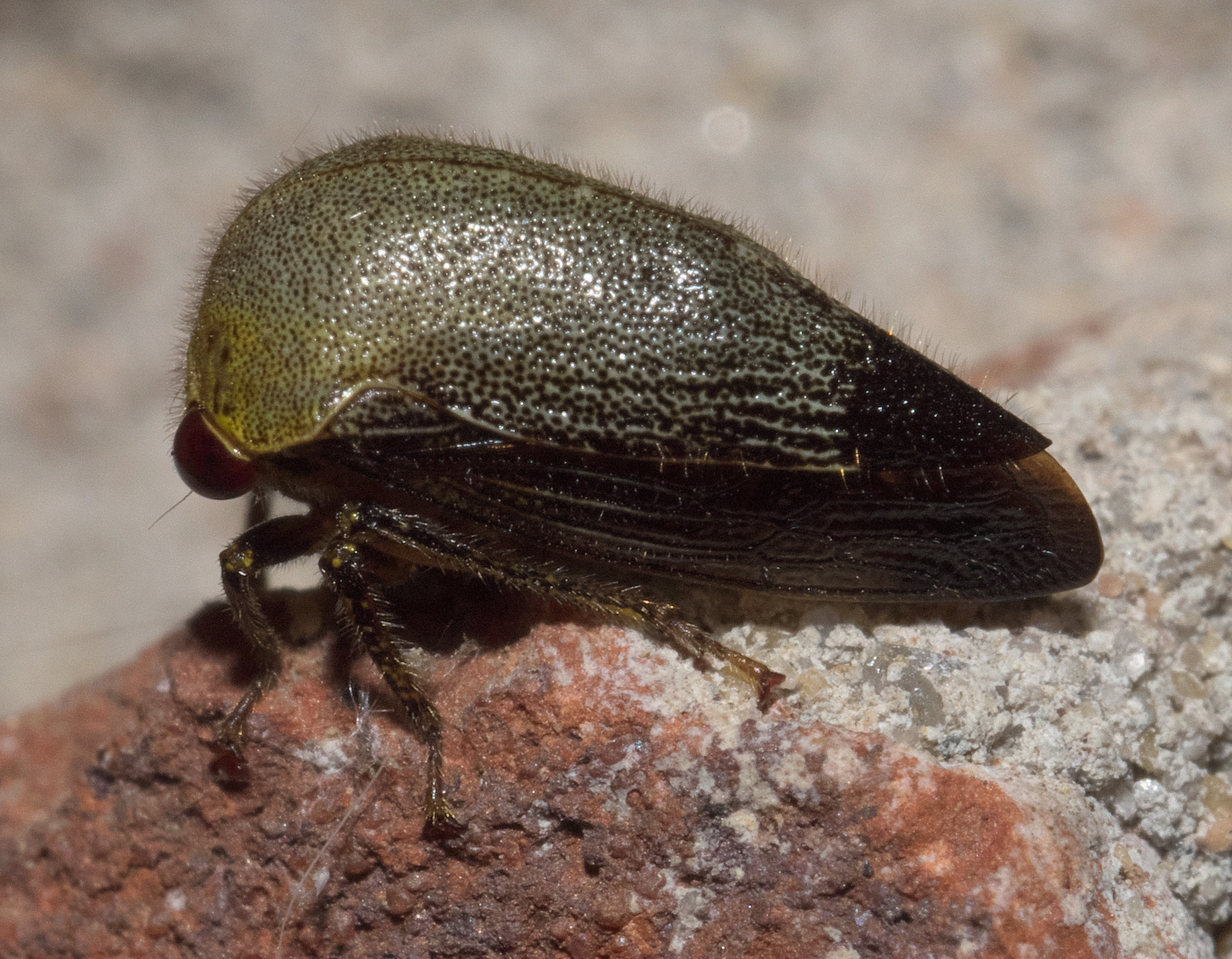
- Carynota mera

Scientific classification
- Domain: Eukaryota
- Kingdom: Animalia
- Phylum: Arthropoda
- Class: Insecta
- Order: Hemiptera
- Suborder: Auchenorrhyncha
- Family: Membracidae
- Subfamily: Smiliinae
- Tribe: Telamonini

= Telamonini =

Tribe of treehoppers

Telamonini is a tribe of treehoppers in the family Membracidae. There are about 9 genera and at least 50 described species in Telamonini.

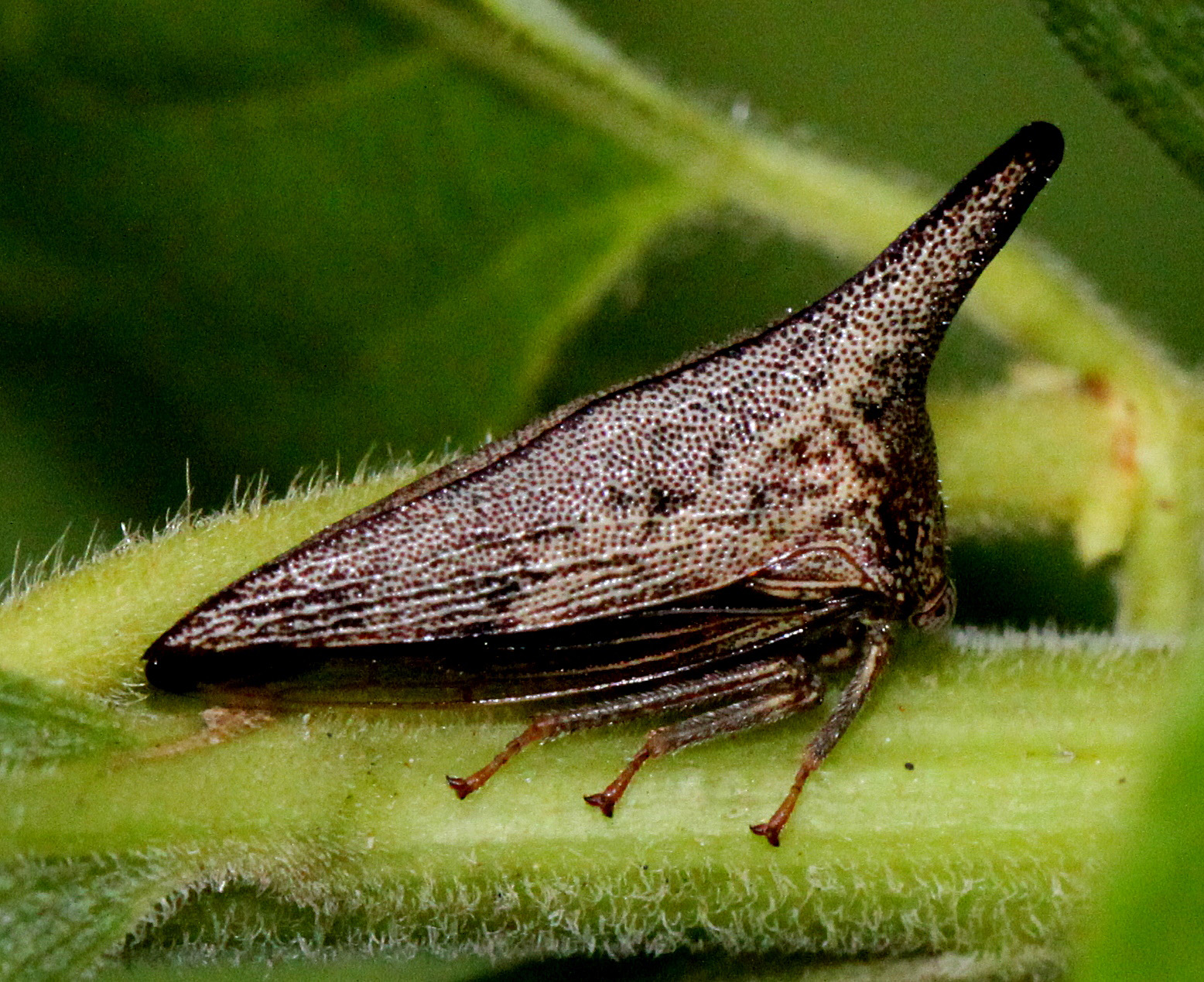
Thelia uhleri

== Genera ==
These nine genera belong to the tribe Telamonini:

- Archasia Stål, 1867^{c g b}
- Carynota Fitch, 1851^{c g b}
- Glossonotus Butler, 1877^{c g b}
- Heliria Stål, 1867^{c g b}
- Palonica Ball, 1932^{c g b}
- Telamona Fitch, 1851^{c g b}
- Telamonanthe Baker, 1907^{c g b}
- Telonaca Ball, 1918^{c g b}
- Thelia Amyot & Serville, 1843^{c g b}

Data sources: i = ITIS, c = Catalogue of Life, g = GBIF, b = Bugguide.net
