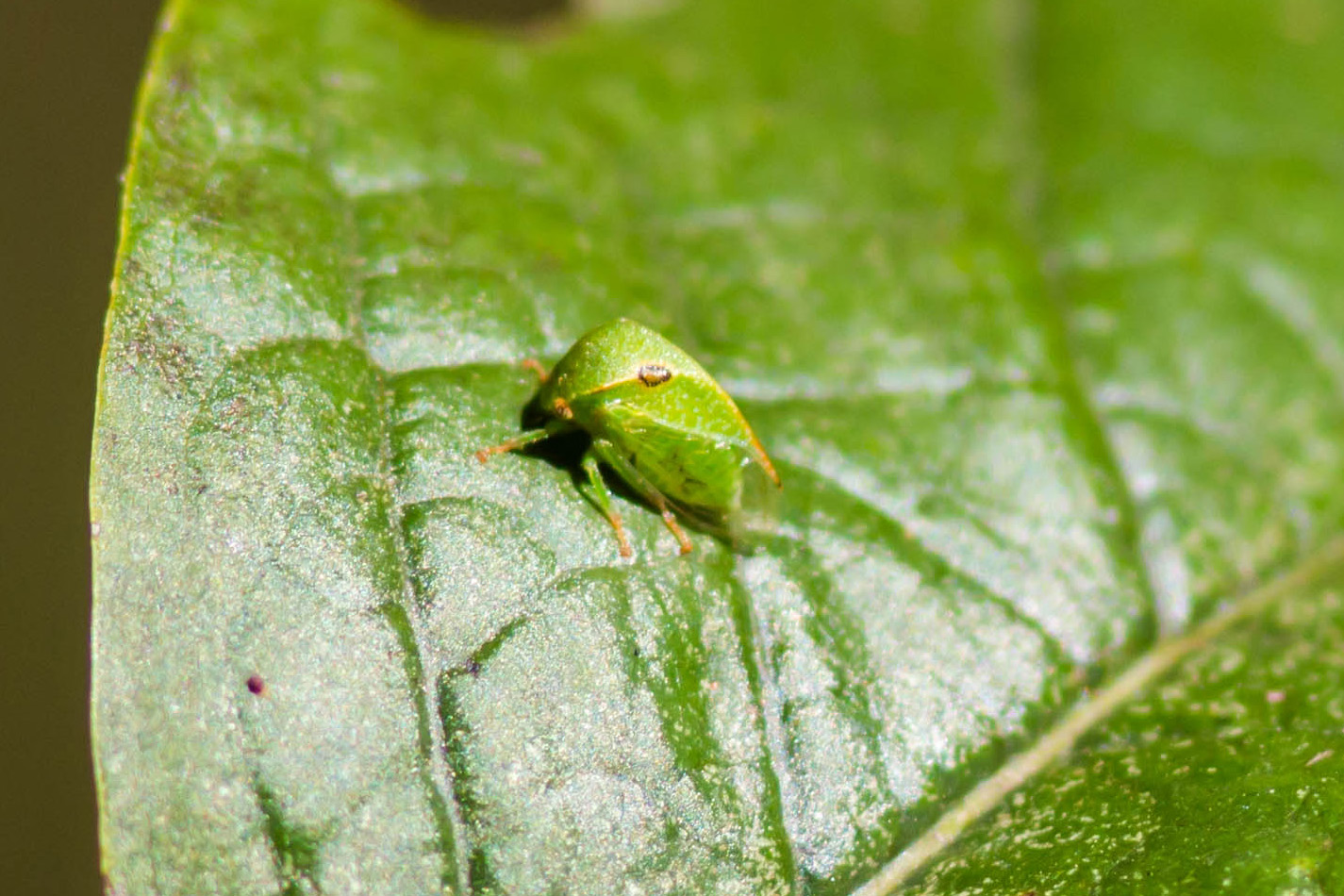

Scientific classification
- Kingdom: Animalia
- Phylum: Arthropoda
- Class: Insecta
- Order: Hemiptera
- Suborder: Auchenorrhyncha
- Family: Membracidae
- Genus: Spissistilus
- Species: S. festinus

Binomial name
- Spissistilus festinus (Say, 1830)

Synonyms
- Membracis festina Say, 1830; Stictocephala festina (Say, 1830)

= Spissistilus festinus =

Species of treehopper

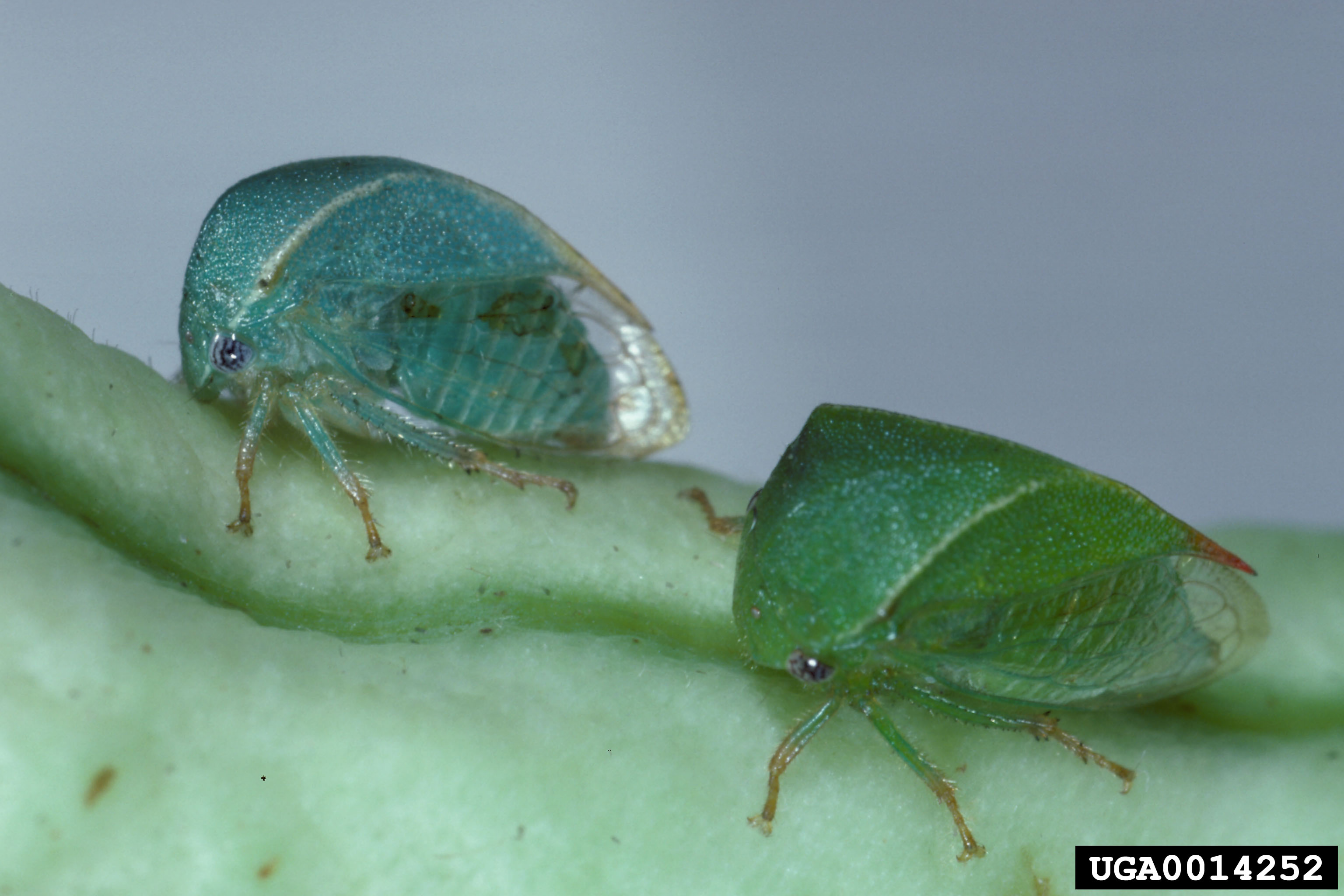
Two adults

Spissistilus festinus, the threecornered alfalfa hopper, is a species of treehopper in the family Membracidae. The common name is in reference to the species' notoriety as an alfalfa pest. S. festinus is a transcontinental species, spanning across Canada to the West Indies, and is most commonly found in the southern United States.

== Taxonomy ==
The species was first described by Thomas Say in a publication dated 1830 as Membracis festina. It was later transferred to the genus Stictocephala as S. festina, and then to the genus Spissistilus, of which it is the type species. It is placed in subfamily Smiliinae, tribe Ceresini.

== Morphology ==
S. festinus is about 6-7mm long in adulthood, with a pronotum that spans to the tip of the abdomen. The species common name references the shape of the pronotum; the presence of three corners, one at the apex, and one at each shoulder, produces a "threecornered" appearance when viewed from the front. Live adult species are a light green colour; when dried and pinned, species appear deep orange to straw coloured. Adult males are distinguishable from females based on a starkly smaller body size, as well as a red tint on the dorsal side of the pronotum.

== Life cycle ==
S. festinus has a hemimetabolous life cycle that includes three stages: egg, nymph and adult. Female eggs are white in colour, oblong in shape, and range in size from 0.9 to 1.3mm long. Eggs have a small and large end, with the larger end being covered in papillae; this is thought to secure the egg within the plant tissue of the host species. Female S. festinus uses ovipositor to create a slit under the epidermis of the host plant. The oviposition behaviour is dependent on the host plant species; in alfalfa plants, eggs are typically deposited near the base of the plant, just below the surface of the soil. The number of eggs laid per slit is also dependent on the host plant species. Following oviposition, embryonic development lasts from 6 to 27 days before the nymph emerges from the egg.

Nymphal development typically lasts between 18 and 33 days, though may require longer as temperatures deviate from 30 degrees. There are typically 5 instars, though it can vary between 4–6; the number and length of instars is dependent on temperature and nutritional conditions. The first and second instars of S. festinus is 1.6mm and 2.1mm in length respectively, and develop a series of spurs along the length of the spine. The third instar is 2.9mm in length, and transitions from pale green or straw-like in colour to a darker yellow-brown with green markings. The first three instars typically last 3–5 days each. The fourth and fifth instars last 4–8 days each, and develop more pronounced wingpads, spurs, and pronotum, and grow progressively greener. Across instars 3–5, the dorsal spurs grow more prominent, and mobility increases significantly compared to instars 1 and 2.

Females mate soon after they reach sexual maturity around 7–14 days in adulthood. Males will die off quickly following mating, but females will live for about another 38.6 days. The reproductive period of females lasts about 38 days, where a female can produce more than 220 eggs, carrying 21–30 eggs in her ovaries at a time.

== Plant hosts ==
S. festinus have been found to use a wide variety of plant hosts. Plant species in the family Fabaceae seem to be favoured for reproduction and feeding, though feeding interactions between S. festinus and over 171 unique plant genera have been recorded. Typical hosts include alfalfa, peanuts, and soybeans

== Feeding and diet ==
S. festinus is a phloem feeder with distinct feeding behaviours. Using its piercing and sucking mouth parts, S. festinus probes petioles and shoots to obtain phloem sap, as well as create a series of lateral punctures around the stem of its host plant.

== Defensive behaviours ==
S. festinus nymphs have been observed to produce a globule from the abdomen as a defense mechanism, paired with retreat to another sector of the stem. Adults have been observed to do the same, though prefer to fly away. Generally, just above the plant canopy, or 33cm above the soil. Flight capacity for females and males differ, with males flying for a longer time and further distances compared to females.

== Economic importance ==
=== Damage to plant hosts ===
The reproductive and feeding habits of S. festinus cause significant damage to its different plant hosts, which led them to gain notoriety as pests. Mainly intermediate and final instars cause damage by puncturing to the petioles and shoots of different plants while feeding, which causes girdling. The process of oviposition causes shredding in the stem of reproductive hosts.

=== Vector of Grapevine red blotch virus ===
S. festinus causes a serious threat to the United States wine industry due to its vectoring of Grapevine red blotch virus (GRBV). When S. festinus feed on GRBV infected plants, the virus moves through the gut, to then circulate within the blood. It then reaches the salivary glands, which connect to the salivary canal, where it can then be transmitted to healthy plants when S. festinus feed. Southeastern S. festinus have been recorded to acquire and transmit GRBV more readily than Californian S. festinus, due to variation in genotype. Though the transmission of GRBV causes significant problems for the wine industry, S. festinus is regarded as an indirect pest of grapevine plants, as the damage caused by girdling is found to be economically insignificant.

=== Biological control ===
Studies on S. festinus susceptibility to predation as a tool for population control in crop systems have been of interest over the years. Specific combinations of predator species and instar level of S. festinus have been found to determine mortality rates. Larvae of Chrysoperla rufilabris commonly known as "red-lipped green lacewing", have been found to show mortality to all instars of S. festinus. Hippodamia convergens, commonly known as the "convergent lady beetle", have been found to prey on first and second instars of S.festinus, likely due to the size similarity with aphids, the typical prey of H. convergens. Other species of Hemiptera, Nabis roseipennis and Geocoris punctipes, have also been studied as potential predators. N. roseipennis have been found to prey on all life stages of S. festinus.
