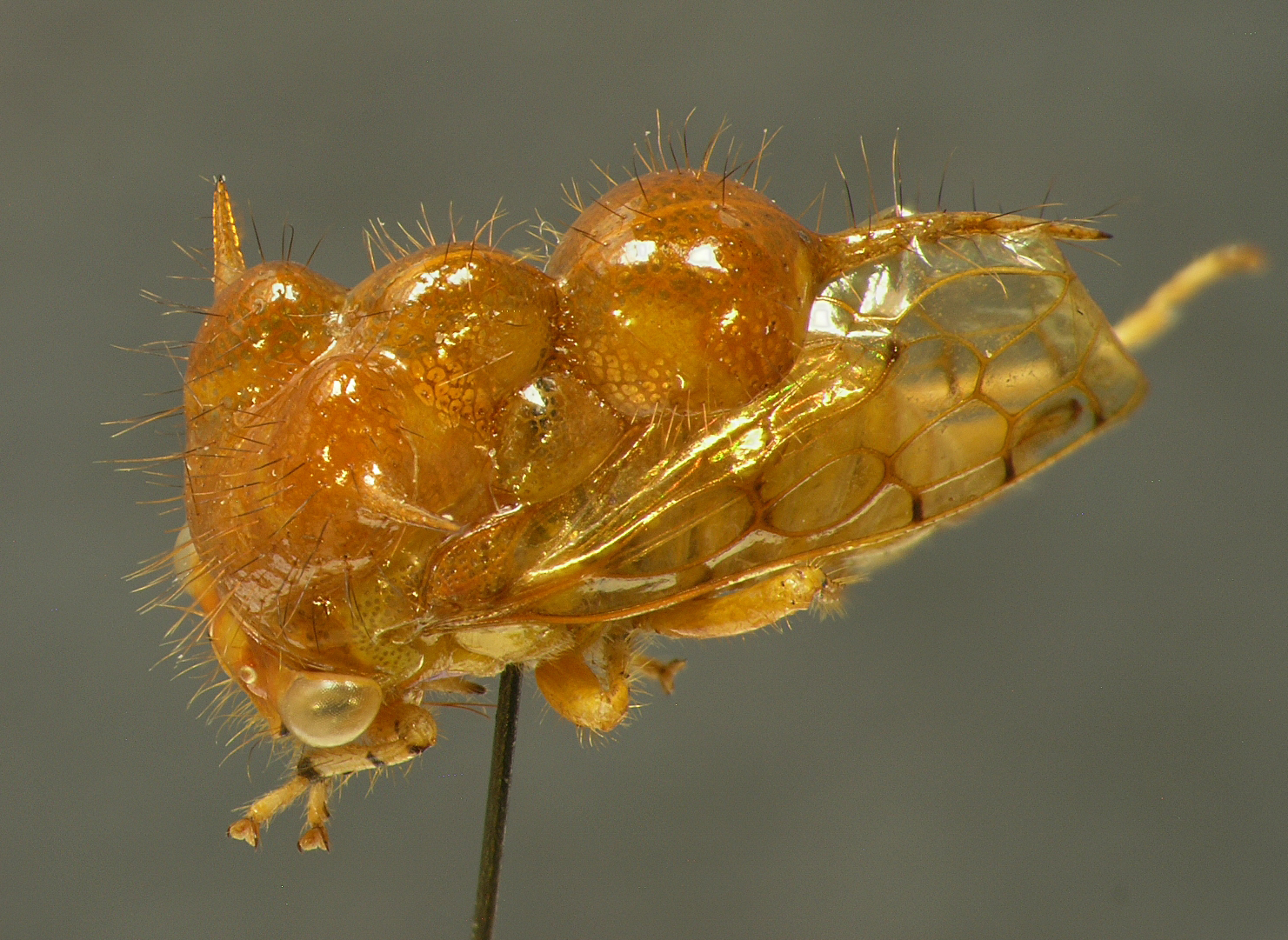
- Antonae guttipes

Scientific classification
- Kingdom: Animalia
- Phylum: Arthropoda
- Clade: Pancrustacea
- Class: Insecta
- Order: Hemiptera
- Suborder: Auchenorrhyncha
- Family: Membracidae
- Tribe: Ceresini
- Genus: Antonae; Stål, 1867

Type species
- Antonae tigrina (Fairmaire, 1846)

Synonyms
- Tumayaua Schmidt, 1906

= Antonae =

Genus of treehoppers

Antonae is a genus of treehoppers in the family Membracidae.

== Description ==
Members of Antonae are about 6.9 to 10.2 millimetres in size, usually yellowish in color, often with black spots or black with yellow spots. The Pronotum is divided by a constriction. The frontal part is rounded and often has lateral spines. The rear part is rounded and relatively thick. Similarly humpbacked Membracidae belong to e.g. Ilithucia, Parantonae and Lallemandia. The genus Illithucia has at times been regarded as a synonym of Antonae (e.g. in the catalog of Membracidae), but more recently is again considered a separate genus, and several species have been exchanged between them.

== Distribution ==
The genus is found in the Neotropics, in northern South America, Central America and Mexico. A relatively large number of species are known from Colombia. Only recently, a species from Brazil was described for the first time. Some species occur at relatively high altitudes (3000 to 4000 m) where they are associated with plants of the genus Espeletia. However, others also occur in lowland rainforests of the lowlands (e.g. Antonae guttipes).

== Ecology ==
The adults are mostly solitary, sometimes nymphs with adults have been found in groups under leaves or on the tops of plants. The larvae are very well camouflaged with the hairy coat of the plants. They live almost exclusively on plants of the families Asteraceae and Solanaceae, where they feed on phloem.

== Species ==
These 14 species belong to the genus Antonae:

- Antonae bulbosa Funkhouser, 1930
- Antonae eva (Schmidt, 1906)
- Antonae flaccida (Fairmaire, 1846)
- Antonae gracilicornis (Richter, 1943)
- Antonae guttipes (Walker, 1858)
- Antonae incrassata (Fairmaire, 1846)
- Antonae inflata Stål, 1869
- Antonae nigerrima (Richter, 1943)
- Antonae nigropunctata Goding, 1929
- Antonae nigrovittata (Richter, 1943)
- Antonae nodosa Funkhouser, 1914
- Antonae praegrandis Richter, 1943
- Antonae sufflava (Richter, 1943)
- Antonae tigrina (Fairmaire, 1846)

== Taxonomy ==
Other selected affiliated species:

- For Antonae centrotoides see Ilithucia centrotoides (Walker, 1858)
- For Antonae ciliata see Ilithucia ciliata (Fairmaire, 1846)
- For Antonae elegans see Ilithucia elegans (Fowler, 1895)
- For Antonae incornigera see Ilithucia incornigera (Richter, 1942)
- For Antonae pacificata see Ilithucia pacificata (Buckton, 1905)
- For Antonae terminata see Ilithucia terminata (Fairmaire, 1846)
