= Bilimekia =

Scientific classification
- Kingdom: Animalia
- Phylum: Arthropoda
- Clade: Pancrustacea
- Class: Insecta
- Order: Hemiptera
- Suborder: Auchenorrhyncha
- Family: Membracidae
- Subfamily: Smiliinae
- Tribe: Polyglyptini
- Genus: Bilimekia; Fowler, 1895

Genus of insects

Bilimekia is a genus of treehoppers belonging to the subfamily Smiliinae. Its species are found in Mexico.

== Description ==
Species of Bilimekia have a yellow pronotum. The pronotum stretches past the head horizontally, a characteristic of most treehoppers of the tribe Polyglyptini.

== Species ==
There are 3 species assigned to this genus:

- Bilimekia broomfieldi Hinton, 1977
- Bilimekia minor Fowler, 1895
- Bilimekia styliformis Fowler, 1895
