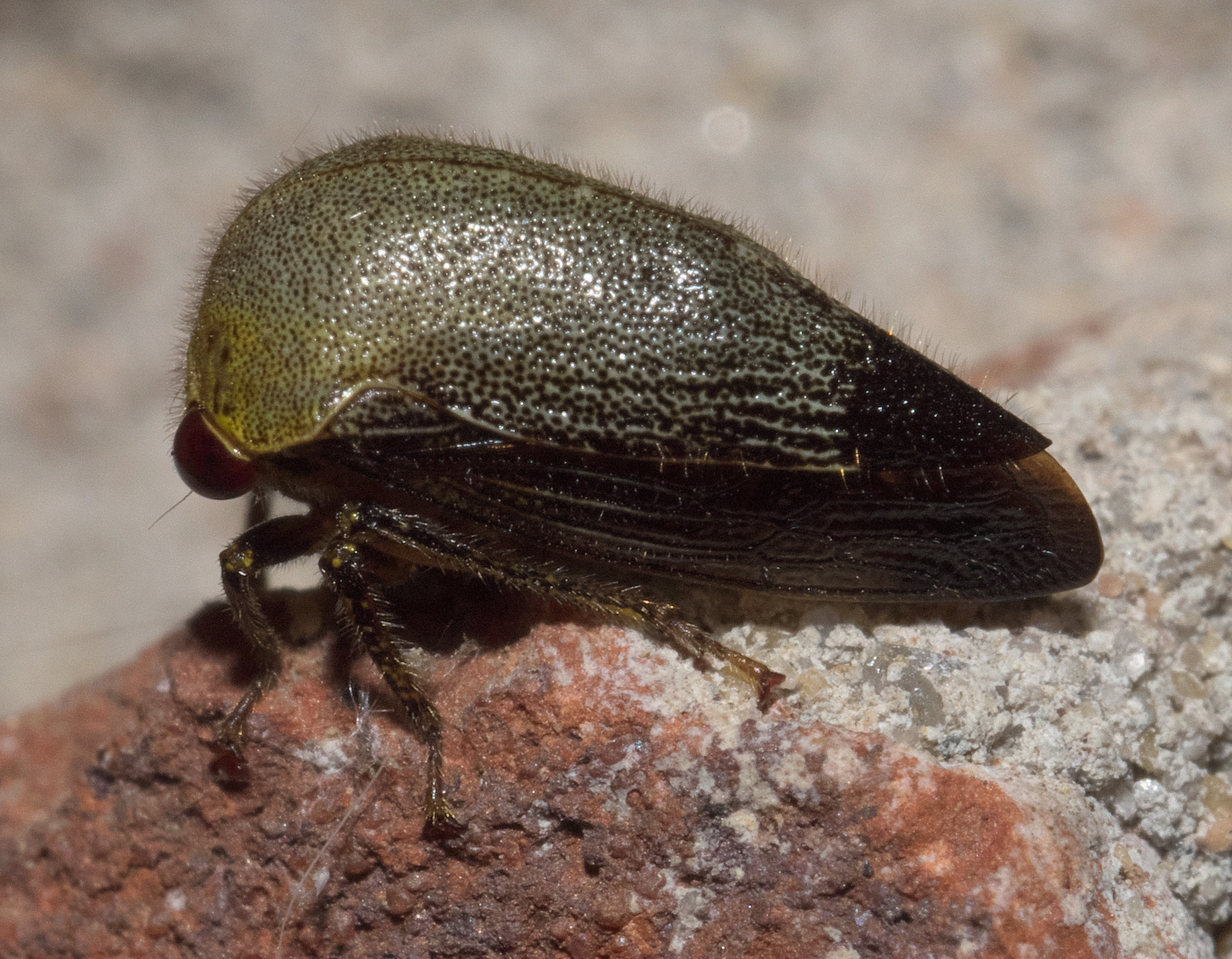

Scientific classification
- Kingdom: Animalia
- Phylum: Arthropoda
- Clade: Pancrustacea
- Class: Insecta
- Order: Hemiptera
- Suborder: Auchenorrhyncha
- Family: Membracidae
- Genus: Carynota
- Species: C. mera

Binomial name
- Carynota mera (Say, 1830)

Synonyms
- Membracis mera Say, 1830

= Carynota mera =

Species of insect

Carynota mera is a species of treehopper. It belongs to the genus Carynota in the family Membracidae. It was first described by Thomas Say in 1830 as Membracis mera.

== Habitat ==
Carynota mera is found across the Eastern United States and Eastern Canada.

== Appearance ==
The pronotum of Carynota mera, unlike other treehoppers of Telamonini, is rounded. Males are 8.5 mm long while females are 10 mm long.
