= Adippe (treehopper) =

Scientific classification
- Domain: Eukaryota
- Kingdom: Animalia
- Phylum: Arthropoda
- Class: Insecta
- Order: Hemiptera
- Suborder: Auchenorrhyncha
- Family: Membracidae
- Subfamily: Smiliinae
- Genus: Adippe; Stål, 1867

Genus of insects

Adippe is a genus of treehoppers belonging to the tribe Polyglyptini, in the subfamily Smiliinae, that contains 8 species.

== Species ==
- Adippe alliacea (Germar, 1835)
- Adippe amseli Strümpel, 1988
- Adippe histrio (Walker, 1858)
- Adippe inaequalis Fowler, 1896
- Adippe nigrorubra Funkhouser, 1922
- Adippe pardalina Fowler, 1896
- Adippe testudo Buckton, 1903
- Adippe zebrina (Fairmaire, 1846)
