= Thrasymedes (disambiguation) =

Thrasymedes was an ancient Greek sculptor.

Thrasymedes may also refer to:

- Thrasymedes (mythology), multiple figures from Greek mythology, including:
  - Thrasymedes (son of Nestor), a participant in the Trojan War
- Thrasymedes (treehopper), a genus of treehoppers
