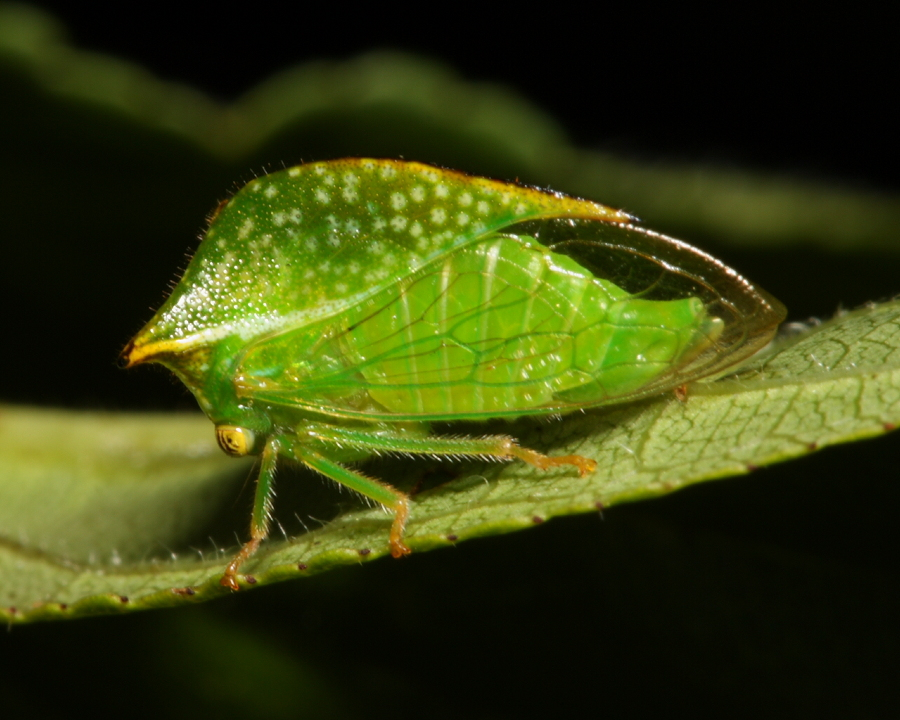

Scientific classification
- Domain: Eukaryota
- Kingdom: Animalia
- Phylum: Arthropoda
- Class: Insecta
- Order: Hemiptera
- Suborder: Auchenorrhyncha
- Family: Membracidae
- Genus: Ceresa
- Species: C. taurina

Binomial name
- Ceresa taurina Fitch, 1856

Synonyms
- Membracis taurina Fitch, 1856; Stictocephala taurina Fitch; Ceresa illinoiensis Goding, 1893; Membracis taurina Harris, 1835; Membracis taurina Harris, 1852; Enchenopa taurina Walker, 1851

= Ceresa taurina =

Species of insect

Ceresa taurina is a species of treehopper of the genus Ceresa first described by Asa Fitch in 1856.

== Habitat ==
Ceresa taurina is found across the eastern USA and southern Canada and abundant in the summer months. It is polyphagous.

== Appearance ==
Ceresa taurina is around 7.5 millimetres (0.30 in) long. It is similar to the species of the genera Stictocephala
