= Bryantopsis =

Scientific classification
- Domain: Eukaryota
- Kingdom: Animalia
- Phylum: Arthropoda
- Class: Insecta
- Order: Hemiptera
- Suborder: Auchenorrhyncha
- Family: Membracidae
- Subfamily: Smiliinae
- Tribe: Polyglyptini
- Genus: Bryantopsis; Ball, 1937
- Species: B. ensigera

Binomial name
- Bryantopsis ensigera Ball, 1937

Genus of insects

Bryantopsis is a genus of treehoppers belonging to the subfamily Smiliinae.

== Classification ==
Bryantopsis contains the single species, Bryantopsis ensigera, which is divided into two subspecies, Bryantopsis ensigera ensigera and Byrantopsis ensigera humerosa.

== Distribution ==
Treehoppers of the genus Bryantopsis are found in southwestern United States and northern Mexico.
