= Euritea =

Scientific classification
- Kingdom: Animalia
- Phylum: Arthropoda
- Class: Insecta
- Order: Hemiptera
- Suborder: Auchenorrhyncha
- Family: Membracidae
- Tribe: Acutalini
- Genus: Euritea; Stål, 1867

Genus of insects

Euritea is a genus of treehoppers belonging to the subfamily Smiliinae. It was first described by Carl Stål in 1867, and contains three species.

== Species ==
There are three species recognized in this genus:

- Euritea fasciata Buckton, 1902
- Euritea munda (Walker, 1858)
- Euritea personata (Stål, 1869)
