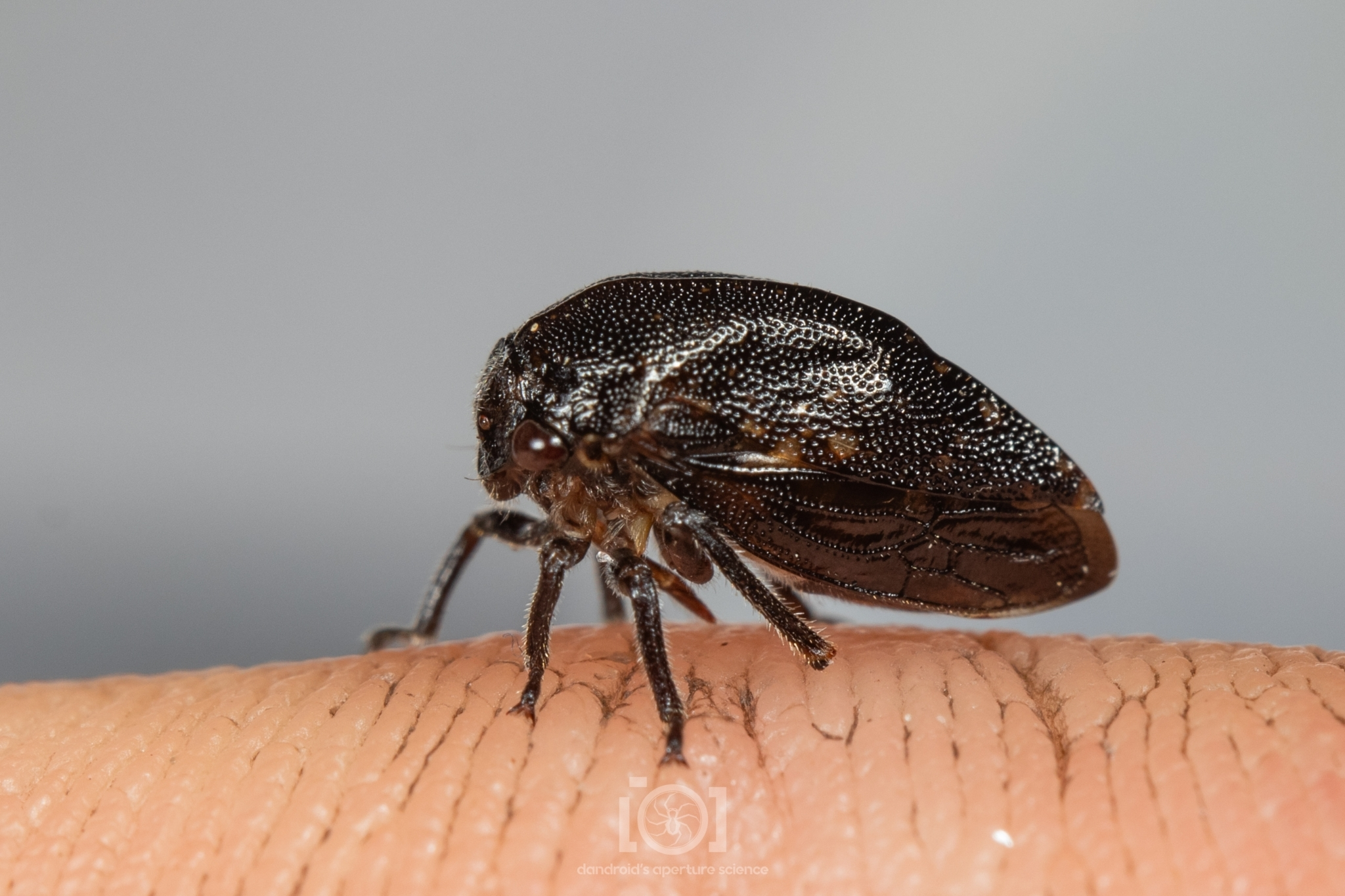

Scientific classification
- Domain: Eukaryota
- Kingdom: Animalia
- Phylum: Arthropoda
- Class: Insecta
- Order: Hemiptera
- Suborder: Auchenorrhyncha
- Family: Membracidae
- Genus: Carynota
- Species: C. maculata

Binomial name
- Carynota maculata Funkhouser, 1915

= Carynota maculata =

Species of insect

Carynota maculata is a species of treehopper belonging to the genus Carynota. It was first described by William Delbert Funkhouser in 1915.

== Habitat ==
Carynota maculata is found in eastern Florida. It feeds on the willow oak (Quercus phellos).
