= Trachytalis distinguenda =

Scientific classification
- Kingdom: Animalia
- Phylum: Arthropoda
- Class: Insecta
- Order: Hemiptera
- Suborder: Auchenorrhyncha
- Family: Membracidae
- Genus: Trachytalis
- Species: T. distinguenda

Binomial name
- Trachytalis distinguenda Fowler, 1895

Species of insect

Trachytalis distinguenda is a species of treehopper in the family Membracidae.
