= Paraceresa =

Scientific classification
- Domain: Eukaryota
- Kingdom: Animalia
- Phylum: Arthropoda
- Class: Insecta
- Order: Hemiptera
- Suborder: Auchenorrhyncha
- Family: Membracidae
- Subfamily: Smiliinae
- Tribe: Ceresini
- Genus: Paraceresa; Kopp and Yonke, 1979

Genus of insects

Paraceresa is a genus of treehoppers belonging to the subfamily Smiliinae. It contains 11 species.

== Species ==
- Paraceresa bifasciata (Fairmaire, 1846)
- Paraceresa biguttata (Remes Lenicov, 1971)
- Paraceresa brasiliensis (Remes Lenicov, 1971)
- Paraceresa chacoensis (Remes Lenicov, 1973)
- Paraceresa colon (Germar, 1835)
- Paraceresa deltae (Remes Lenicov, 1973)
- Paraceresa ornithisca (Remes Lenicov, 1978)
- Paraceresa pallidinervis (Remes Lenicov, 1970)
- Paraceresa spinosa (Remes Lenicov, 1973)
- Paraceresa trifasciata (Remes Lenicov, 1971)
- Paraceresa unguicularis (Stål, 1862)
