= Palonica =

Scientific classification
- Domain: Eukaryota
- Kingdom: Animalia
- Phylum: Arthropoda
- Class: Insecta
- Order: Hemiptera
- Suborder: Auchenorrhyncha
- Family: Membracidae
- Subfamily: Smiliinae
- Tribe: Telamonini
- Genus: Palonica; Ball, 1932

Genus of insects

Palonica is a genus of treehopper. It belongs to the tribe Telamonini in the subfamily Smiliinae. There are 4 described species in Palonica.

== Species ==
- Palonica nogalana
- Palonica pyramidata
- Palonica tremulata
- Palonica viridia
