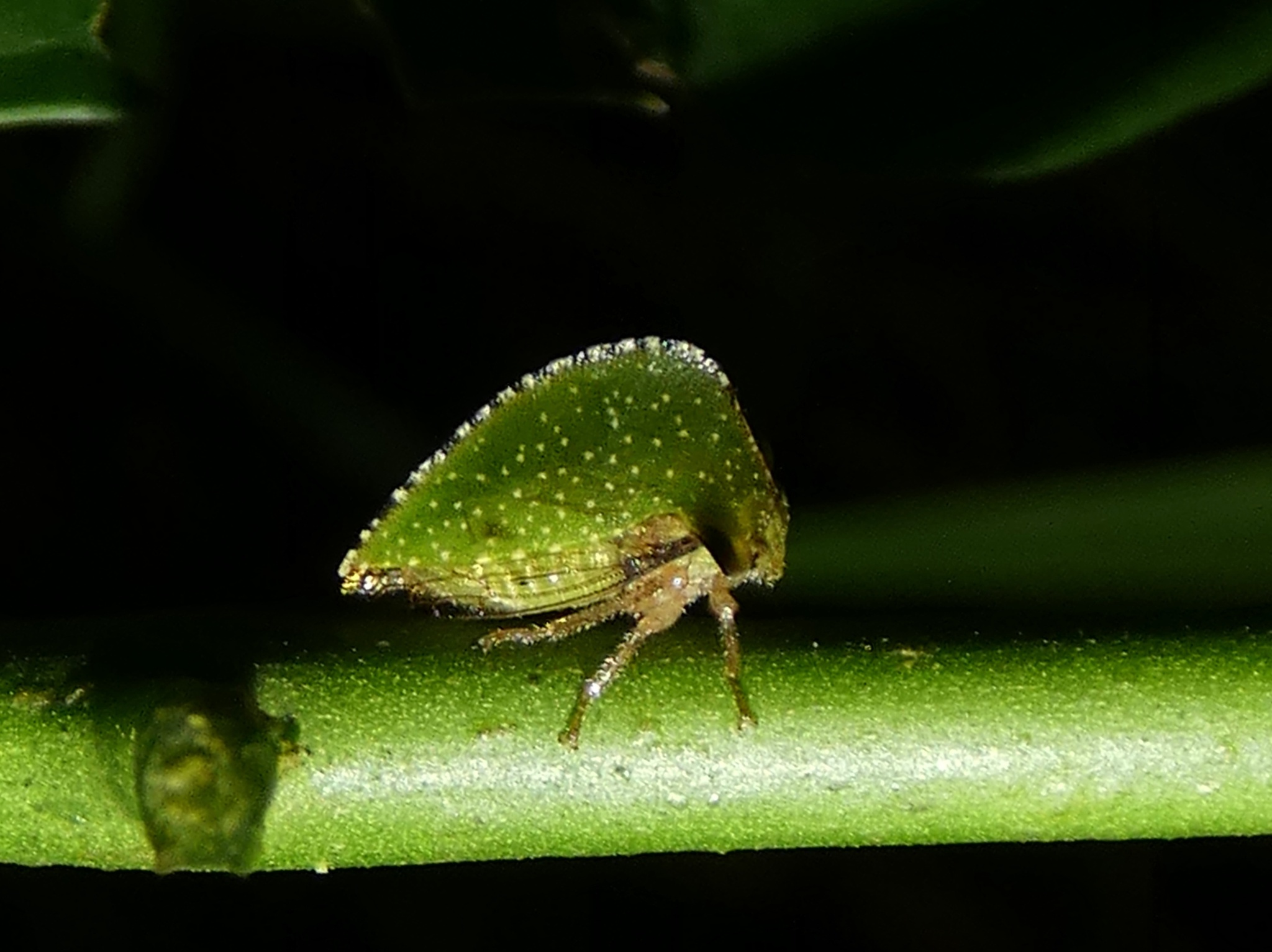

Scientific classification
- Kingdom: Animalia
- Phylum: Arthropoda
- Clade: Pancrustacea
- Class: Insecta
- Order: Hemiptera
- Suborder: Auchenorrhyncha
- Family: Membracidae
- Genus: Antianthe
- Species: A. expansa

Binomial name
- Antianthe expansa (Germar, 1835)

= Antianthe expansa =

Species of true bug

Antianthe expansa, known generally as the keeled tree hopper or solanaceous treehopper, is a species of treehopper in the family Membracidae.

== Subspecies ==
These two subspecies belong to the species Antianthe expansa:

- Antianthe expansa expansa
- Antianthe expansa humilis Fowler
