= Trachytalis retrofasciata =

Scientific classification
- Kingdom: Animalia
- Phylum: Arthropoda
- Clade: Pancrustacea
- Class: Insecta
- Order: Hemiptera
- Suborder: Auchenorrhyncha
- Family: Membracidae
- Genus: Trachytalis
- Species: T. retrofasciata

Binomial name
- Trachytalis retrofasciata Lethierry, 1890

Species of insect

Trachytalis retrofasciata is a species of treehopper. It belongs to the genus Trachytalis.
