= Amblyophallus =

Scientific classification
- Domain: Eukaryota
- Kingdom: Animalia
- Phylum: Arthropoda
- Class: Insecta
- Order: Hemiptera
- Suborder: Auchenorrhyncha
- Family: Membracidae
- Subfamily: Smiliinae
- Genus: Amblyophallus; Kopp & Yonke, 1979

Genus of insects

Amblyophallus is a genus of treehoppers belonging to the subfamily Smiliinae. It contains 5 species.

== Species ==
- Amblyophallus elevatus (Funkhouser, 1919)
- Amblyophallus exaltatus (Fabricius, 1803)
- Amblyophallus maculatus (Funkhouser, 1927)
- Amblyophallus marginatus (Funkhouser, 1940)
- Amblyophallus phleboleucus (Sakakibara, 1969)
