= Neotynelia =

Scientific classification
- Domain: Eukaryota
- Kingdom: Animalia
- Phylum: Arthropoda
- Class: Insecta
- Order: Hemiptera
- Suborder: Auchenorrhyncha
- Family: Membracidae
- Subfamily: Smiliinae
- Genus: Neotynelia; Creão-Duarte & Sakakibara, 2000

Type species
- Darnis pubescens (Fabricius, 1803)

Genus of insects

Neotynelia is a genus of treehoppers belonging to the family Membracidae. It is found in South and Central America.

== Species ==
The World Auchenorrhyncha Database lists the following species of Neotynelia:

- Neotynelia bandeirai Creão-Duarte & Sakakibara, 2000
- Neotynelia distinguenda (Fowler, 1895)
- Neotynelia martinsi Creão-Duarte & Sakakibara, 2000
- Neotynelia nigra (Funkhouser, 1940)
- Neotynelia pubescens (Fabricius, 1803)
- Neotynelia rafaeli Creão-Duarte & Sakakibara, 2000
- Neotynelia vertebralis (Fairmaire, 1846)
