= Aphetea =

Scientific classification
- Domain: Eukaryota
- Kingdom: Animalia
- Phylum: Arthropoda
- Class: Insecta
- Order: Hemiptera
- Suborder: Auchenorrhyncha
- Family: Membracidae
- Subfamily: Smiliinae
- Genus: Aphetea; Fowler, 1895

Type species
- Aphetea inconspicua Fowler, 1895

Genus of insects

Aphetea is a genus of treehoppers belonging to the family Membracidae. It contains 7 species, one of which is divided into 5 subspecies.

== Species and subspecies ==
- Aphetea bicolor Goding, 1926
  - Aphetea bicolor bicolor Goding, 1926
  - Aphetea bicolor curvata Goding, 1929
  - Aphetea bicolor flava Goding, 1929
  - Aphetea bicolor notata Goding, 1929
  - Aphetea bicolor strigata Goding, 1929
- Aphetea inconspicua Fowler, 1895
- Aphetea maculata Funkhouser, 1927
- Aphetea nigropicta Funkhouser, 1943
- Aphetea parvula (Fabricius, 1803)
- Aphetea punctata Funkhouser, 1927
- Aphetea robustula Sakakibara, 1996
