= Grablovirus =

Virus classification
- (unranked): Virus
- Realm: Monodnaviria
- Kingdom: Shotokuvirae
- Phylum: Cressdnaviricota
- Class: Repensiviricetes
- Order: Geplafuvirales
- Family: Geminiviridae
- Genus: Grablovirus

Genus of viruses

Grablovirus is a genus of plant viruses in the family Geminiviridae. The genus has three species.

== Taxonomy ==
The genus contains the following species, listed by scientific name and followed by the exemplar virus of the species:

- Grablovirus pruni, Prunus geminivirus A
- Grablovirus silvestris, Wild Vitis virus 1
- Grablovirus vitis, Grapevine red blotch virus
