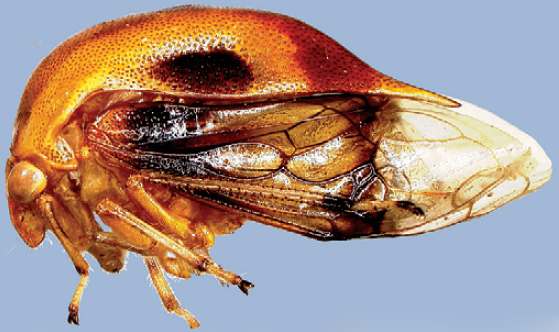

Scientific classification
- Domain: Eukaryota
- Kingdom: Animalia
- Phylum: Arthropoda
- Class: Insecta
- Order: Hemiptera
- Suborder: Auchenorrhyncha
- Family: Membracidae
- Subfamily: Smiliinae
- Genus: Smilirhexia; McKamey, 2008
- Species: S. naranja

Binomial name
- Smilirhexia naranja McKamey, 2008

= Smilirhexia =

Genus of insects

Smilirhexia is a genus of treehoppers belonging to the subfamily Smiliinae. It contains only one species, Smilirhexia naranja.

== Gallery ==
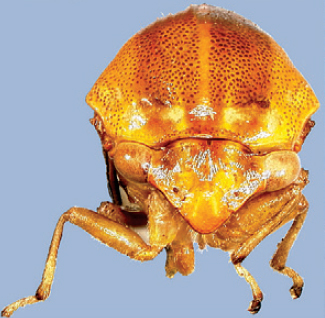
Anterior view of S. naranja

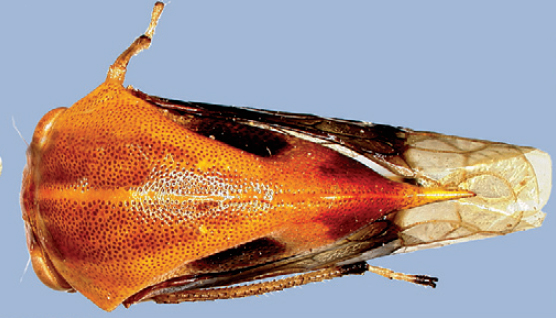
Dorsal view of S. naranja
