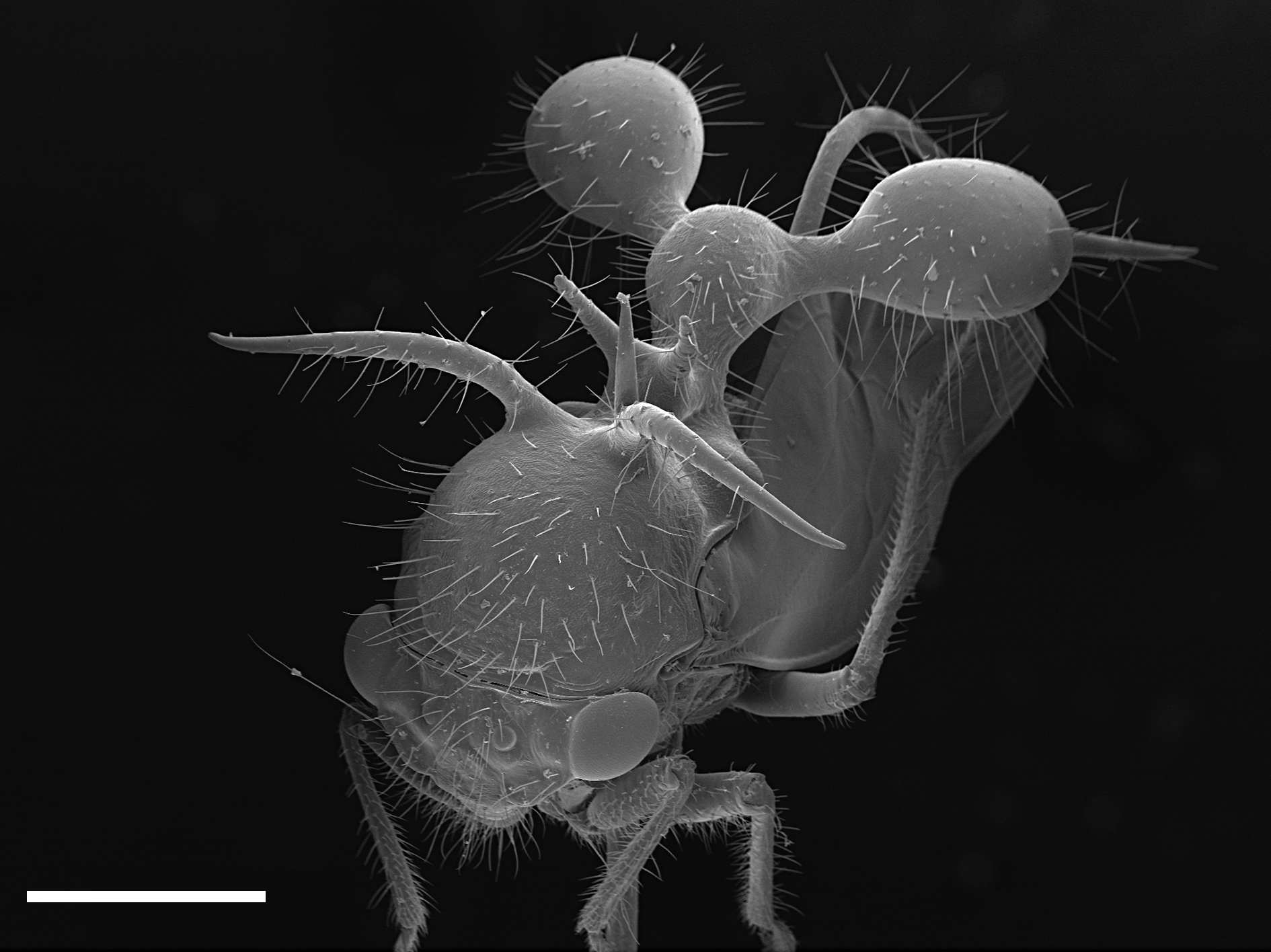

Scientific classification
- Domain: Eukaryota
- Kingdom: Animalia
- Phylum: Arthropoda
- Class: Insecta
- Order: Hemiptera
- Suborder: Auchenorrhyncha
- Family: Membracidae
- Subfamily: Smiliinae
- Tribe: Ceresini
- Genus: Cyphonia; Laporte, 1832

= Cyphonia =

Genus of insects

Cyphonia is a genus of treehopper belonging to the subfamily Smiliinae. It contains 33 species.

== Species ==
- Cyphonia ancoralis Berg, 1883
- Cyphonia andina Sakakibara & Evangelista de Souza, 2008
- Cyphonia braccata (Germar, 1835)
- Cyphonia cabetteae Barreira & Sakakibara, 2001
- Cyphonia capra (Burmeister, 1833)
- Cyphonia clavata (Fabricius, 1787)
- Cyphonia claviger (Fabricius, 1803)
- Cyphonia colenophora Berg, 1879
- Cyphonia digitata Sakakibara, 1968
- Cyphonia flava (Burmeister, 1833)
- Cyphonia flavomaculata Sakakibara, 1968
- Cyphonia flavovittata Stål, 1869
- Cyphonia fucifer Laporte, 1832
- Cyphonia guyanensis Sakakibara, 1972
- Cyphonia hirta (Germar, 1835)
- Cyphonia horizontalis Sakakibara, 1968
- Cyphonia intermedia Sakakibara, 1968
- Cyphonia lenkoi Sakakibara, 1968
- Cyphonia leptostyla Sakakibara, 1968
- Cyphonia longispina Sakakibara, 1968
- Cyphonia longistyla Sakakibara, 1972
- Cyphonia nordestina Sakakibara, 1968
- Cyphonia punctipennis Sakakibara, 1968
- Cyphonia pygmaea Sakakibara, 1968
- Cyphonia rostrata Sakakibara, 1972
- Cyphonia sakakibarai McKamey, 2017
- Cyphonia saturalis Berg, 1883
- Cyphonia scabra Sakakibara, 1968
- Cyphonia sinuata Sakakibara, 1968
- Cyphonia trifida (Fabricius, 1787)
- Cyphonia tumefata Andrade, 2004
- Cyphonia weyrauchi Richter, 1958
- Cyphonia xavantina Barreira & Sakakibara, 2001
