= Grapevine red blotch disease =

Grapevine red blotch virus

Virus classification
- (unranked): Virus
- Realm: Floreoviria
- Kingdom: Shotokuvirae
- Phylum: Cressdnaviricota
- Class: Repensiviricetes
- Order: Geplafuvirales
- Family: Geminiviridae
- Genus: Grablovirus
- Species: Grablovirus vitis

Viral disease affecting grapevines

Grapevine red blotch disease (GRBD), also known simply as red blotch, is a viral disease of grapevine. The disease is caused by a single-stranded circular DNA virus, the species Grapevine red blotch virus, also known as Grapevine red blotch-associated virus, GRBaV. First identified in California, the disease affects grapevines of all varieties and is internationally present. Symptoms typically include red blotches on the leaves of red varieties and in pale green or pale yellow blotches on white varieties. It significantly reduces the value of juice collected from the berries of affected vines, costing vineyard owners as much as $65,000 per acre.

The discovery of red blotch and GRBaV is jointly credited to Mysore Sudarshana, a USDA-ARS virologist stationed at UC Davis, and Keith Perry and Marc Fuchs, virologists from Cornell. The three-cornered alfalfa treehopper (Spissistilus festinus) was confirmed as a vector for the disease in 2016, but there are currently no advised treatments for red blotch other than removing and replacing affected vines.

== Discovery ==
In 2008, UC Davis researchers Jim Wolpert and Mike Anderson suspected a new strain of grapevine leafroll disease had emerged at an experimental research station in Oakville, California.

Mysore Sudarshana discovered the disease was entirely different and named it red blotch. After four years of research, he confirmed the disease was caused by GRBaV through a metagenomics approach by next-generation sequencing. Sudarshana also confirmed the virus affected many different varieties of grapevine through testing of Cabernet Sauvignon, Cabernet Franc, and Zinfandel.

Concurrently, Keith Perry and Marc Fuchs encountered the same virus while DNA-testing a Cabernet Franc vineyard in New York. Unaware the virus affected many types of grapevines, they initially called the virus "grapevine cabernet franc–associated virus". In Spring 2011, Perry and Fuchs sent the DNA they had found to Sudarshana, who confirmed the virus was GRBaV. In Fall 2012, Sudarshana, Perry, and Fuchs formally presented grapevine red blotch disease as a joint discovery to the International Council for the Study of Viruses and Virus-like Diseases of the Grapevine.

== Symptoms ==
Red blotch presents with both foliar and fruit symptoms. Foliar symptoms typically begin appearing in mid-summer as irregular blotches on leaf blades at the base of infected grapevines. Over time, the blotches spread upward from the base to the top of the grapevine canopy. In red grape varieties, the blotches are red; in white grape varieties, the blotches may be pale green to pale yellow.

Red blotch disease results in delayed berry ripening, altered berry color, and a smaller berry size. It adversely affects pH, anthocyanin levels, tannin levels, and other phenolic factors that reduce the quality and market value of wine made from affected grapes. Sugar accumulation may be significantly reduced, typically dropping by 3 degrees Brix and dropping by as much as 6 degrees Brix in some varieties. Premium wine producers in California estimate that a 100% red blotch infection can reduce the value of a vineyard by as much as $68,000 per acre.

Research indicates that red blotch is not a new disease, but has been overlooked until its discovery at UC Davis in 2008 because its symptoms appear similar to those of grapevine leafroll disease. There are two key symptomatic differences between the diseases. While both diseases result in abnormal red coloring on affected grapevine leaves, leafroll affected leaves only turn red in and around the secondary veins of the grapevine leaf; red blotch affected leaves turn red in both the primary and secondary veins as well as in the interveinal zones. Secondly, unlike with leafroll, leaves affected by red blotch do not typically roll inwards at their edges. Symptoms of red blotch may also be mistaken for plant stress or nutritional deficiencies.

== Cause ==
Red blotch is caused by Grapevine red blotch virus, also called grapevine red blotch-associated virus (GRBaV), a single-stranded circular DNA virus. GRBaV is a member of the genus Grablovirus, and is one of only a few geminiviruses currently known to infect woody perennial plants. Within GRBaV, two groups of genetic variants have been identified so far.

== Epidemiology ==
Research suggests a wide geographic distribution, as well as a widespread occurrence in red and white vinifera cultivars. Infected vines have been identified in California, New York, Virginia, Maryland, Pennsylvania, Texas, and Washington. A nearly identical virus was found in Canada.

GRBaV has been found both in young and mature vineyards, and has been detected in Cabernet Franc, Cabernet Sauvignon, Chardonnay, Malbec, Merlot, Mourvèdre, Petite Syrah, Petit Verdot, Pinot noir, Riesling, and Zinfandel.

=== Vectors ===
In 2016, Sudarshana, UC Davis entomology professor Frank Zalom, and UC Davis post-doctoral researcher Brian Bahder identified the first known insect vector for GRBaV: the three-cornered alfalfa treehopper (Spissistilus festinus). Previously considered a minor vineyard pest in the North Coast, the three-cornered alfalfa treehopper spreads GRBaV while injecting salivary fluid into plant material to pre-digest it. The injection leads to tell-tale girdling at the injection site on grapevine petioles.

The three-cornered alfalfa treehopper's preferred hosts include grasses, legumes, and its namesake alfalfa. These plants are often found on the edges of vineyards in riparian areas, which may explain the spread of the disease in some vineyards. Sudarshana and Zalom are currently investigating closely related insect species to identify additional vectors.

GRBaV is transmittable by grafting, but there is no evidence that it can be transmitted by mechanical means such as pruning shears or other gardening tools.

=== Management ===
Currently, the only advised method of control is replacing infected vines with new, virus-free grapevines, which results in years of lost production until the new vines mature. Economic analyses suggest replacing individual symptomatic vines if red blotch is present in less than 30% of a vineyard, and replacing the entire vineyard if red blotch is present in more than 30%. The use of pesticides to control the three-cornered alfalfa treehopper is not currently recommended.
