= Anobilia =

Scientific classification
- Domain: Eukaryota
- Kingdom: Animalia
- Phylum: Arthropoda
- Class: Insecta
- Order: Hemiptera
- Suborder: Auchenorrhyncha
- Family: Membracidae
- Subfamily: Smiliinae
- Tribe: Tragopini
- Genus: Anobilia; Tode, 1966

Genus of treehopper

Anobilia is a genus of treehopper belonging to the tribe Tragopini. It was described by Tode in 1966.

== Species ==
There are 15 species in the genus:

- Anobilia flava Tode, 1966
- Anobilia guianae Haviland
- Anobilia impercepta Tode, 1966
- Anobilia invariabilis Tode, 1966
- Anobilia luteimaculata Funkhouser
- Anobilia minima Tode, 1966
- Anobilia nigra Tode, 1966
- Anobilia pilosa Tode, 1966
- Anobilia sagittata Tode, 1966
- Anobilia saurauiana Tode, 1966
- Anobilia silvana Tode, 1966
- Anobilia simplex Tode, 1966
- Anobilia splendida Tode, 1966
- Anobilia tripartita Fairmaire
- Anobilia variabilis Tode, 1966
