= Tragopa =

Scientific classification
- Kingdom: Animalia
- Phylum: Arthropoda
- Clade: Pancrustacea
- Class: Insecta
- Order: Hemiptera
- Suborder: Auchenorrhyncha
- Family: Membracidae
- Subfamily: Smiliinae
- Genus: Tragopa; Latreille, 1829

Type species
- Membracis albimacula Germar, 1821

Diversity
- 41 species

Species of treehopper

Tragopa is a genus of treehoppers. It belongs to the tribe Tragopini in the subfamily Smiliinae. It contains 41 species. It was described by Pierre André Latreille in 1829.

== Species ==
Tragopa consists of the following species:

- Tragopa albifascia (Funkhouser, 1922)
- Tragopa albimacula (Germar, 1821)
- Tragopa annulata (Fabricius, 1803)
- Tragopa bajulus (Germar, 1835)
- Tragopa bicolor (Goding, 1928)
- Tragopa bipartita (Fairmaire, 1846)
- Tragopa bitriangulata (Funkhouser, 1930)
- Tragopa brunneimaculata (Funkhouser, 1922)
- Tragopa bugabensis (Fowler, 1895)
- Tragopa coccinella (Fairmaire, 1846)
- Tragopa corniculata (Stål, 1869)
- Tragopa cyanea (Burmeister, 1836)
- Tragopa decorata (Funkhouser, 1914)
- Tragopa dimidiata (Fairmaire, 1846)
- Tragopa discrepans (Walker, 1858)
- Tragopa fasciata (Funkhouser, 1922)
- Tragopa fenestrata (Walker, 1858)
- Tragopa frontalis (Fairmaire, 1846)
- Tragopa fulvovaria (Fairmaire, 1846)
- Tragopa funerula (Fairmaire, 1846)
- Tragopa globus (Germar, 1821)
- Tragopa humeralis (Fairmaire, 1846)
- Tragopa insignis (Fowler, 1895)
- Tragopa longa (Funkhouser, 1922)
- Tragopa maculidorsa (Funkhouser, 1922)
- Tragopa morio (Fabricius, 1803)
- Tragopa nigra (Sakakibara & Marques, 2007)
- Tragopa obesa (Goding, 1928)
- Tragopa obliqua (Germar, 1821)
- Tragopa occulta (Haviland, 1925)
- Tragopa ovalis (Burmeister, 1836)
- Tragopa perforata (Richter, 1945)
- Tragopa pubescens (Funkhouser, 1922)
- Tragopa pumicata (Stål, 1862)
- Tragopa punctatissima (Fairmaire, 1846)
- Tragopa sacrata (Burmeister, 1836)
- Tragopa sodalis (Goding, 1928)
- Tragopa testudina (Funkhouser, 1943)
- Tragopa tetyrides (Walker, 1851)
- Tragopa tonsilis (Richter, 1945)
- Tragopa zebra (Goding, 1928)
