= Frank Zalom =

American entomologist

- Education: Arizona State University; University of California, Davis
- Scientific career
- Fields: Entomology
- Workplaces: University of California, Davis

Frank G. Zalom is an American entomologist at University of California, Davis and an Elected Fellow of the American Association for the Advancement of Science.

Zalom, together with Mysore Sudarshana and Brian Bahder, is credited with discovering that the three cornered alfalfa treehopper (Ceresa festina), previously considered a minor vineyard pest, is a vector for grapevine red blotch disease in 2016.
