= Trachytalis =

Scientific classification
- Domain: Eukaryota
- Kingdom: Animalia
- Phylum: Arthropoda
- Class: Insecta
- Order: Hemiptera
- Suborder: Auchenorrhyncha
- Family: Membracidae
- Subfamily: Smiliinae
- Genus: Trachytalis; Fowler, 1895

Genus of treehoppers

Trachytalis is a genus of treehoppers in the family Membracidae and subfamily Smiliinae. There are 3 described species in Trachytalis.

== Species ==
- Trachytalis distinguenda
- Trachytalis isabellina
- Trachytalis retrofasciata
