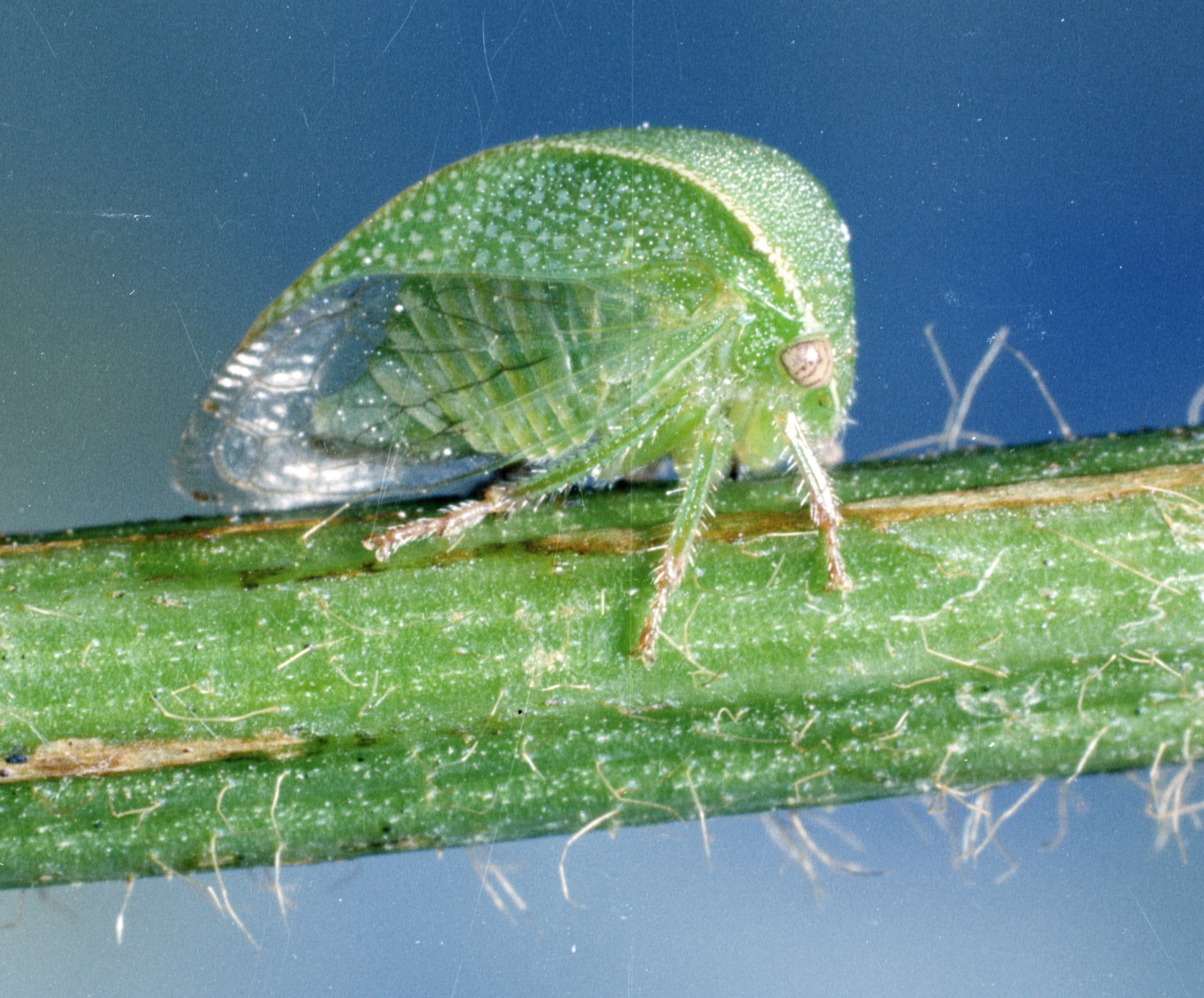
- Spissistilus festinus on soybean (Glycine max)

Scientific classification
- Kingdom: Animalia
- Phylum: Arthropoda
- Class: Insecta
- Order: Hemiptera
- Suborder: Auchenorrhyncha
- Family: Membracidae
- Tribe: Ceresini
- Genus: Spissistilus; Caldwell, 1949

Species
- See text.

= Spissistilus =

Genus of treehoppers

Spissistilus is a genus of treehoppers (family Membracidae). They are native to North and Central America and the West Indies. The species Spissistilus festinus is a major pest of a number of crops, particularly alfalfa and soybean.

== Taxonomy ==
The genus Spissistilus was erected by John S. Caldwell in 1949. The type species is Membracis festina which became Spissistilus festinus. The genus is placed in the tribe Ceresini of the subfamily Smiliinae.

=== Species ===
As of December 2025, the World Auchenorrhyncha Database accepted the following species:

- Spissistilus cornutus (Fowler, 1895)
- Spissistilus discolor (Fairmaire, 1846)
- Spissistilus femoratus (Fairmaire, 1846)
- Spissistilus festinus (Say, 1830)
- Spissistilus nigricans (Van Duzee, 1914)
- Spissistilus puncticeps (Stål, 1864)
- Spissistilus rotundatus (Stål, 1870)
- Spissistilus uniformis (Fairmaire, 1846)
