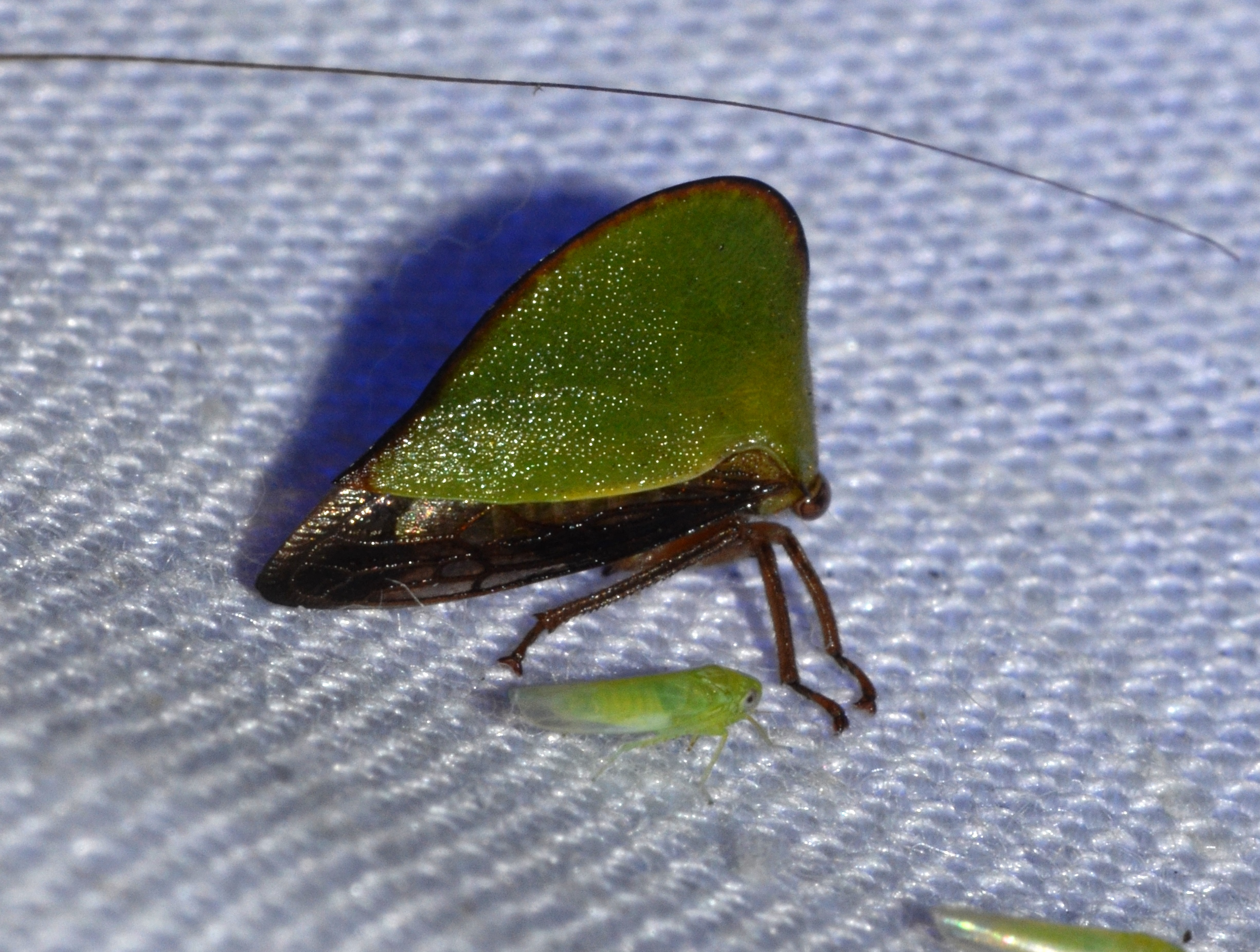
- Antianthe expansa

Scientific classification
- Kingdom: Animalia
- Phylum: Arthropoda
- Clade: Pancrustacea
- Class: Insecta
- Order: Hemiptera
- Suborder: Auchenorrhyncha
- Family: Membracidae
- Subfamily: Smiliinae
- Genus: Antianthe; Fowler, 1896

= Antianthe =

Genus of true bugs

Antianthe is a genus of treehoppers in the family Membracidae. There are about seven described species in Antianthe.

== Species ==
These seven species belong to the genus Antianthe:

- Antianthe atromarginata Goding
- Antianthe boliviana Metcalf
- Antianthe chichiana Funkhouser
- Antianthe expansa (Germar, 1835) (keeled tree hopper)
- Antianthe foliacea Stål
- Antianthe reversa Walker
- Antianthe viridissima Walker
