= Tropidarnis =

Scientific classification
- Domain: Eukaryota
- Kingdom: Animalia
- Phylum: Arthropoda
- Class: Insecta
- Order: Hemiptera
- Suborder: Auchenorrhyncha
- Family: Membracidae
- Genus: Tropidarnis; Fowler, 1895
- Species: T. tectigera

Binomial name
- Tropidarnis tectigera Fowler, 1895

Synonyms
- Tropidarnis acutior Fowler, 1895; Tropidarnis pellicolor Buckton, 1902; Tropidarnis robustus Buckton, 1902

Genus of insects

Tropidarnis is a genus of treehopper belonging to the subfamily Smiliinae, though it is not yet placed in a tribe. It contains the single species, Tropidarnis tectigera.
