= Cornutalis =

Scientific classification
- Domain: Eukaryota
- Kingdom: Animalia
- Phylum: Arthropoda
- Class: Insecta
- Order: Hemiptera
- Suborder: Auchenorrhyncha
- Family: Membracidae
- Subfamily: Smiliinae
- Tribe: Acutalini
- Genus: Cornutalis; Sakakibara, 1998

Genus of insects

Cornutalis is a genus of treehoppers belonging to the subfamily Smiliinae. It was first described by Albino M. Sakakibara in 1998, and contains 3 species.

== Species ==
- Cornutalis andina Flórez-Valencia, 2017
- Cornutalis cauca Sakakibara, 1998
- Cornutalis valida Sakakibara, 1998
