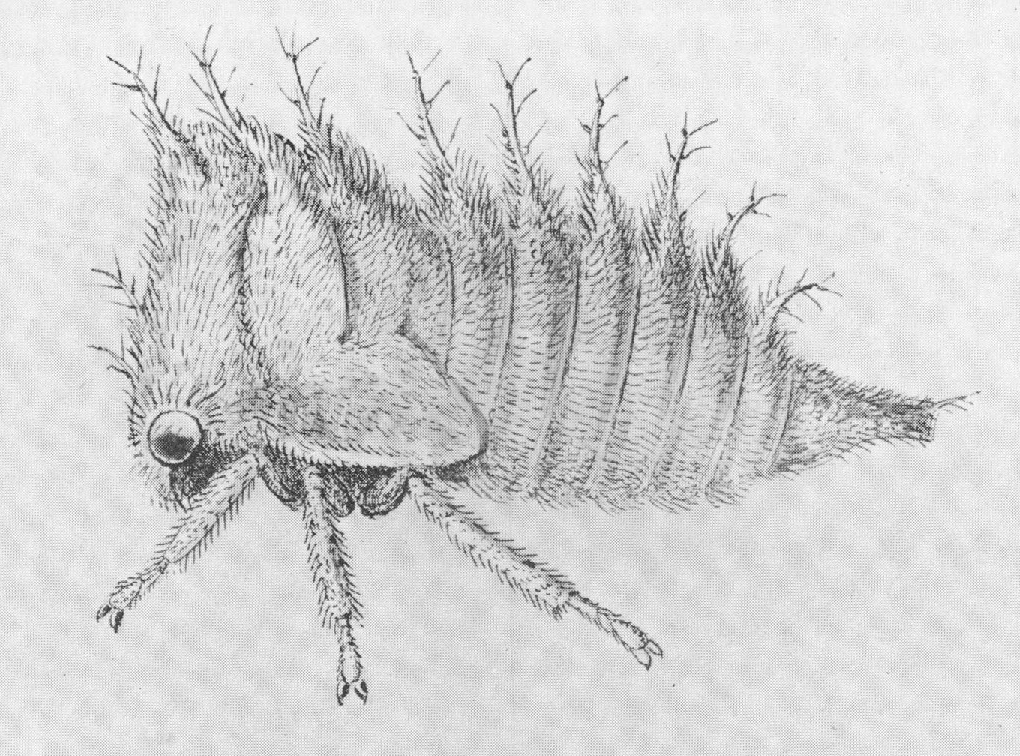
- Nymphal stage of Ceresa albescens

Scientific classification
- Domain: Eukaryota
- Kingdom: Animalia
- Phylum: Arthropoda
- Class: Insecta
- Order: Hemiptera
- Suborder: Auchenorrhyncha
- Family: Membracidae
- Genus: Ceresa
- Species: C. albescens

Binomial name
- Ceresa albescens Van Duzee, 1908

= Ceresa albescens =

Species of true bug

Ceresa albescens, is a species of treehopper, of the genus Ceresa.
