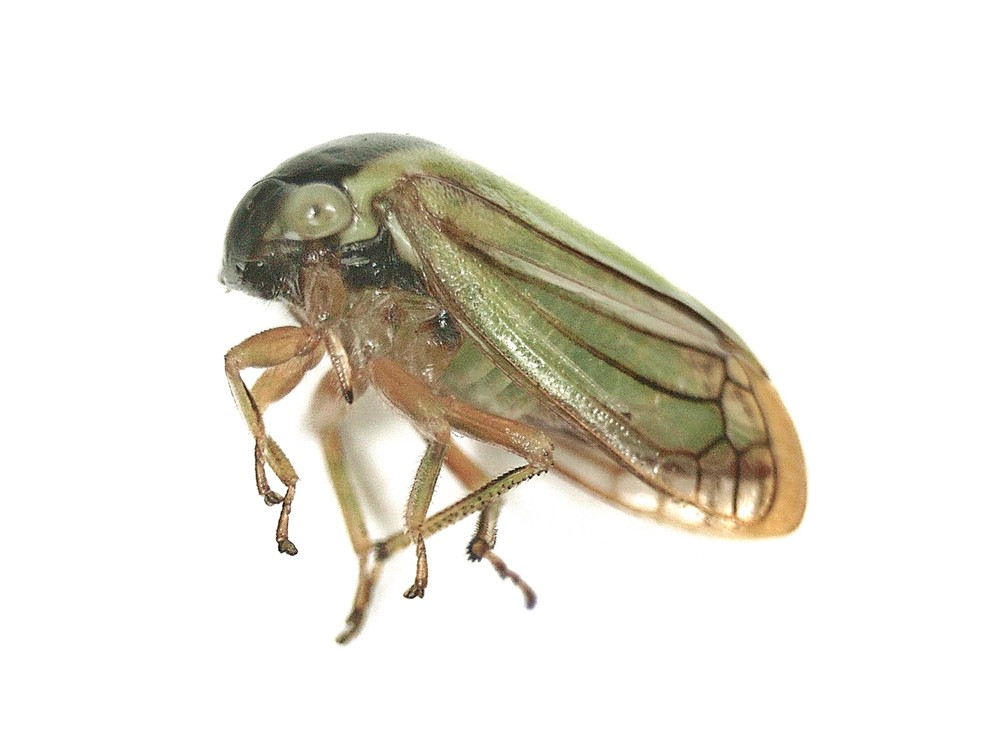
- Acutalis tartarea

Scientific classification
- Domain: Eukaryota
- Kingdom: Animalia
- Phylum: Arthropoda
- Class: Insecta
- Order: Hemiptera
- Suborder: Auchenorrhyncha
- Family: Membracidae
- Subfamily: Smiliinae
- Tribe: Acutalini
- Genus: Acutalis; Fairmaire, 1846

= Acutalis =

Genus of insects

Acutalis is a genus of treehoppers belonging to the subfamily Smiliinae in the family Membracidae. It was first described by Léon Fairmaire in 1846, and contains four species.

== Distribution ==
Acutalis is found in the eastern portion of the United States and Canada. It can be also found in Central America and northern South America.

== Species ==
Acutalis contains the following species:

- Acutalis flavonervosa Buckton, 1902
- Acutalis fusconervosa Fairmaire, 1846
- Acutalis nigrinervis Fowler, 1895
- Acutalis tartarea (Say, 1830)
