= Erosne =

Scientific classification
- Domain: Eukaryota
- Kingdom: Animalia
- Phylum: Arthropoda
- Class: Insecta
- Order: Hemiptera
- Suborder: Auchenorrhyncha
- Family: Membracidae
- Subfamily: Smiliinae
- Genus: Erosne; Stål, 1867

Species
- E. bracteata Stål, 1869; E. contsrica Sakakibara, 1998; E. parvula Evangelista, 2007

Genus of insects

Erosne is a genus of treehoppers in the family Membracidae. It is found in South America.
