= Carynota stupida =

Scientific classification
- Kingdom: Animalia
- Phylum: Arthropoda
- Class: Insecta
- Order: Hemiptera
- Suborder: Auchenorrhyncha
- Family: Membracidae
- Genus: Carynota
- Species: C. stupida

Binomial name
- Carynota stupida (Walker, 1851)

Species of insect

Carynota stupida, the stupefied planthopper is a species of treehopper belonging to the genus Carynota. It was first described by Francis Walker as Darnis stupida Walker, 1851.

== Habitat ==
Carynota stupida is found in the Northeastern USA and Eastern Canada. It feeds on Maple (Acer spp.), Bigtooth Aspen (Populus grandidentata) and birches (Betula spp.).
