= Quadrinarea =

Scientific classification
- Kingdom: Animalia
- Phylum: Arthropoda
- Clade: Pancrustacea
- Class: Insecta
- Order: Hemiptera
- Suborder: Auchenorrhyncha
- Family: Membracidae
- Subfamily: Smiliinae
- Genus: Quadrinarea; Goding, 1927

Species of treehopper

Quadrinarea is a genus of treehoppers belonging to the family Membracidae, containing only two species, Quadrinarea u-flava and Quadrinarea perezi. It is the only genus in the tribe Quadrinareini.
