= Trachytalis isabellina =

Scientific classification
- Kingdom: Animalia
- Phylum: Arthropoda
- Class: Insecta
- Order: Hemiptera
- Suborder: Auchenorrhyncha
- Family: Membracidae
- Genus: Trachytalis
- Species: T. isabellina

Binomial name
- Trachytalis isabellina Fowler, 1895

Species of insect

Trachytalis isabellina is a species of treehopper in the family Membracidae.
