= Bordoniana =

Scientific classification
- Domain: Eukaryota
- Kingdom: Animalia
- Phylum: Arthropoda
- Class: Insecta
- Order: Hemiptera
- Suborder: Auchenorrhyncha
- Family: Membracidae
- Subfamily: Smiliinae
- Tribe: Acutalini
- Genus: Bordoniana; Sakakibara, 1999

Genus of insects

Bordoniana is a genus of treehoppers in the subfamily Smiliinae. It was first described by Albino M. Sakakibara in 1999, and contains 5 species.

== Species ==
- Bordoniana clypeata (Sakakibara, 1998)
- Bordoniana majuscula (Sakakibara, 1998)
- Bordoniana nigricosta (Goding, 1926)
- Bordoniana venezuelana (Sakakibara, 1998)
- Bordoniana virescens (Funkhouser, 1940)
