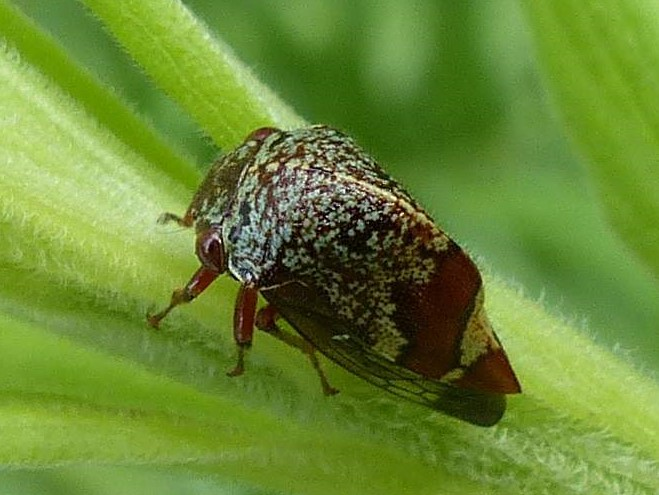

Scientific classification
- Kingdom: Animalia
- Phylum: Arthropoda
- Class: Insecta
- Order: Hemiptera
- Suborder: Auchenorrhyncha
- Family: Membracidae
- Genus: Carynota
- Species: C. marmorata

Binomial name
- Carynota marmorata Say, 1830

= Carynota marmorata =

Species of treehopper

Carynota marmorata, commonly known as the marbled treehopper, is a species of treehopper. It was first described by Thomas Say in 1830.

== Habitat ==
Carynota marmorata is found in the mid-western and eastern United States and eastern Canada. It feeds on multiple types of trees, including:

- Alnus incana (gray alder)
- Betula papyrifera (paper birch)
- Corylus americana (American hazelnut)
- Populus (cottonwood)
- Quercus alba (white oak)

== Description ==
Carynota marmorata has a fairly high, rounded, brown-colored pronotum riddled with yellowish white spots. Adults are 8 millimetres in length and 4 millimetres in width.
