= Antianthe chichiana =

Scientific classification
- Kingdom: Animalia
- Phylum: Arthropoda
- Clade: Pancrustacea
- Class: Insecta
- Order: Hemiptera
- Suborder: Auchenorrhyncha
- Family: Membracidae
- Genus: Antianthe
- Species: A. chichiana

Binomial name
- Antianthe chichiana Funkhouser, 1943

Species of treehopper

Anthianthe chichiana is a species of treehopper belonging to the genus of Antianthe. It was first described by William Delbert Funkhouser in 1943.

== Distribution ==
A. chichiana is found across Central America.
