= Flynnia =

Scientific classification
- Domain: Eukaryota
- Kingdom: Animalia
- Phylum: Arthropoda
- Class: Insecta
- Order: Hemiptera
- Suborder: Auchenorrhyncha
- Family: Membracidae
- Genus: Flynnia; McKamey, 2017
- Species: F. fascipennis

Binomial name
- Flynnia fascipennis (Funkhouser, 1919)

Synonyms
- Ophiderma fascipennis Funkhouser, 1919

Species of insect

Flynnia is a genus of treehoppers in the family Membracidae. It is found in South America. It contains the single species Flynnia fascipennis.
