= Hemicardiacus =

Scientific classification
- Domain: Eukaryota
- Kingdom: Animalia
- Phylum: Arthropoda
- Class: Insecta
- Order: Hemiptera
- Suborder: Auchenorrhyncha
- Family: Membracidae
- Genus: Hemicardiacus; Plummer, 1945
- Species: H. saundersi

Binomial name
- Hemicardiacus saundersi Plummer, 1945

Species of insect

Hemicardiacus is a genus of treehoppers belonging to the family Membracidae. It contains the single species Hemicardiacus saundersi, and is native to Mexico.
