= Thuris =

Scientific classification
- Kingdom: Animalia
- Phylum: Arthropoda
- Clade: Pancrustacea
- Class: Insecta
- Order: Hemiptera
- Suborder: Auchenorrhyncha
- Family: Membracidae
- Genus: Thuris; Funkhouser, 1943

Insect species

Thuris is a genus of treehoppers belonging to the family Membracidae. It is found in South America.

Catalogue of Life lists the following species:

- Thuris depressus Sakakibara, 1975
- Thuris fenestratus Funkhouser, 1943
