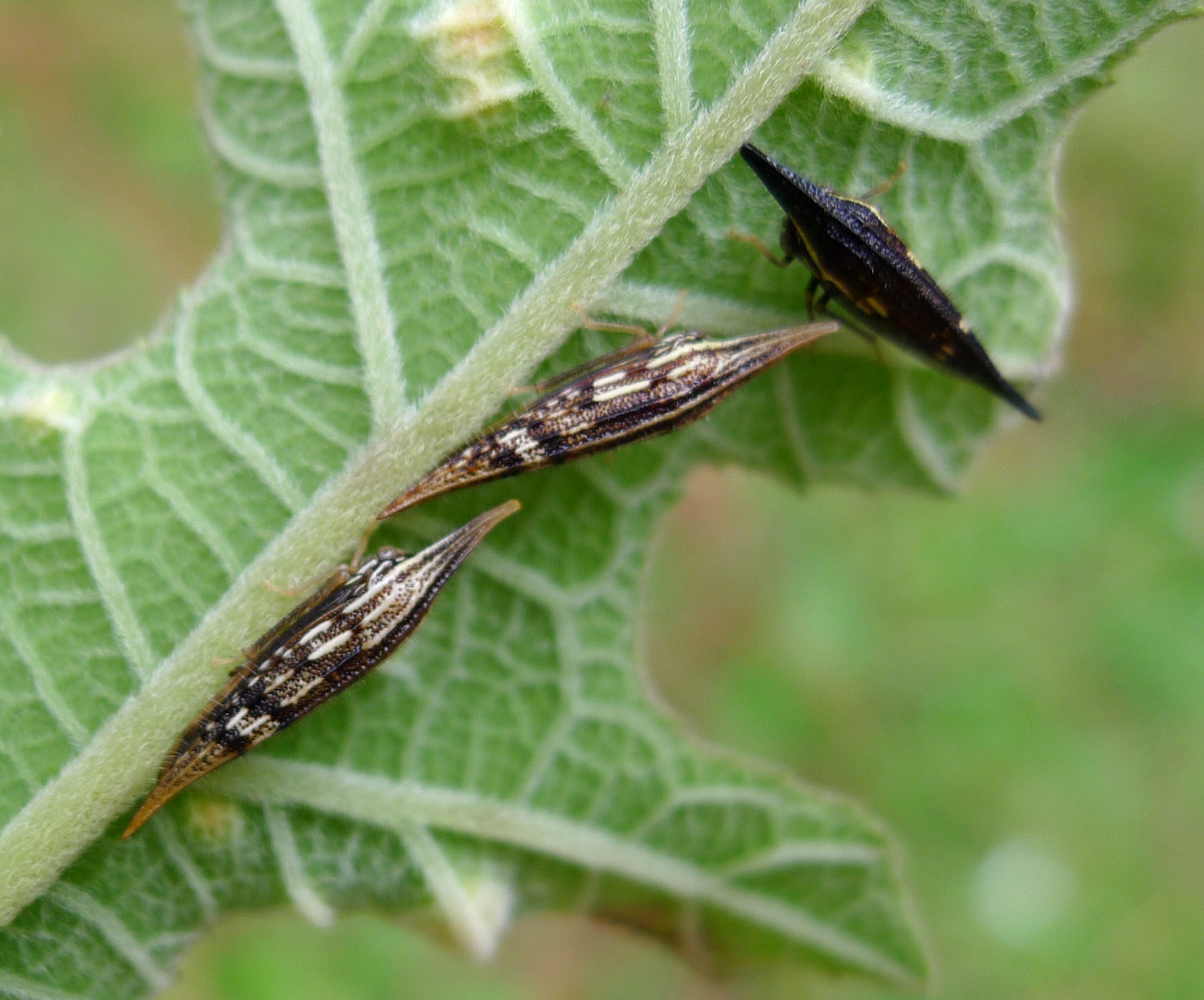

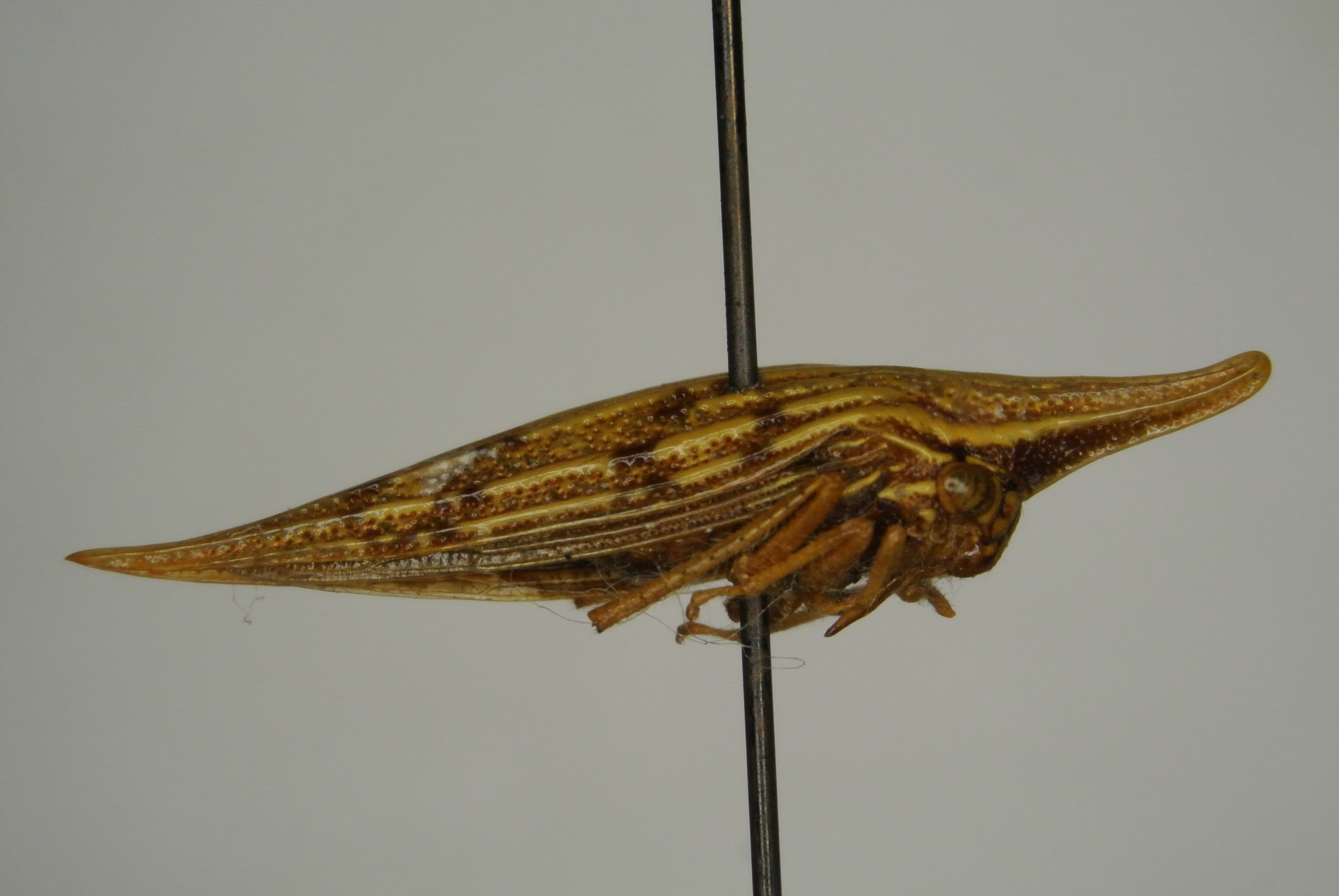

Scientific classification
- Kingdom: Animalia
- Phylum: Arthropoda
- Class: Insecta
- Order: Hemiptera
- Suborder: Auchenorrhyncha
- Family: Membracidae
- Tribe: Polyglyptini
- Genus: Polyglypta; Burmeister, 1835

= Polyglypta =

Genus of treehoppers

Polyglypta is a genus of treehoppers in the family Membracidae. There are at least three described species in Polyglypta.

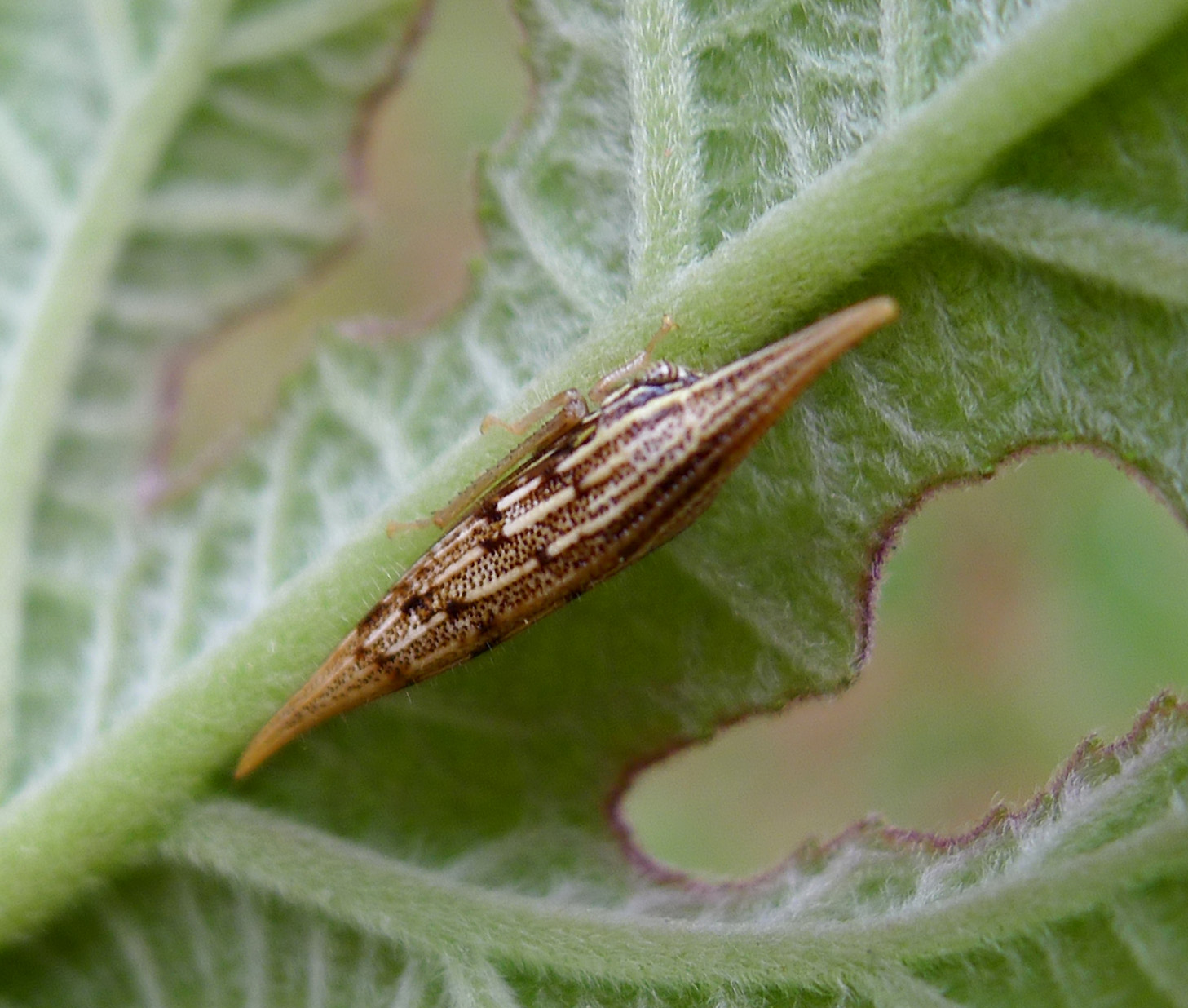

== Species ==
These three species belong to the genus Polyglypta:

- Polyglypta costata Burmeister^{c g}
- Polyglypta dorsalis Burmeister^{c g b}
- Polyglypta lineata Burmeister^{c g}

Data sources: i = ITIS, c = Catalogue of Life, g = GBIF, b = Bugguide.net
