= Thrasymedes (treehopper) =

Scientific classification
- Domain: Eukaryota
- Kingdom: Animalia
- Phylum: Arthropoda
- Class: Insecta
- Order: Hemiptera
- Suborder: Auchenorrhyncha
- Family: Membracidae
- Subfamily: Smiliinae
- Tribe: Acutalini
- Genus: Thrasymedes; Kirkaldy, 1904

Genus of treehoppers

Thrasymedes is a genus of treehoppers belonging to the subfamily Smiliinae. It was described by George Willis Kirkaldy in 1904.

== Species ==
- Thrasymedes flavomarginata (Stål, 1864)
- Thrasymedes mexicana Sakakibara, 1998
- Thrasymedes pallescens (Stål, 1869)
- Thrasymedes variata (Fowler, 1895)
- Thrasymedes walkeri Metcalf & Wade, 1965}
