= Publilia (treehopper) =

Scientific classification
- Kingdom: Animalia
- Phylum: Arthropoda
- Clade: Pancrustacea
- Class: Insecta
- Order: Hemiptera
- Suborder: Auchenorrhyncha
- Family: Membracidae
- Tribe: Polyglyptini
- Genus: Publilia; Stål, 1866

Genus of treehoppers

Publilia is a genus of treehoppers found in the United States.

== Species ==
- Publilia concava Say
- Publilia erecta Plummer
- Publilia modesta Uhler
- Publilia porrecta Fowler
- Publilia reticulata Van Duzee
