= Glossonotus =

Scientific classification
- Kingdom: Animalia
- Phylum: Arthropoda
- Clade: Pancrustacea
- Class: Insecta
- Order: Hemiptera
- Suborder: Auchenorrhyncha
- Family: Membracidae
- Tribe: Telamonini
- Genus: Glossonotus; Butler, 1877

Species
- See text

Genus of true bugs

Glossonotus is a genus of treehopper belonging to the family Membracidae. There are five described species in Glossonotus.

== Species ==
- Glossonotus acuminata Fabricius
- Glossonotus crataegi Fitch
- Glossonotus nimbatulus Ball
- Glossonotus turriculata Emmons
- Glossonotus univittatus Harris
