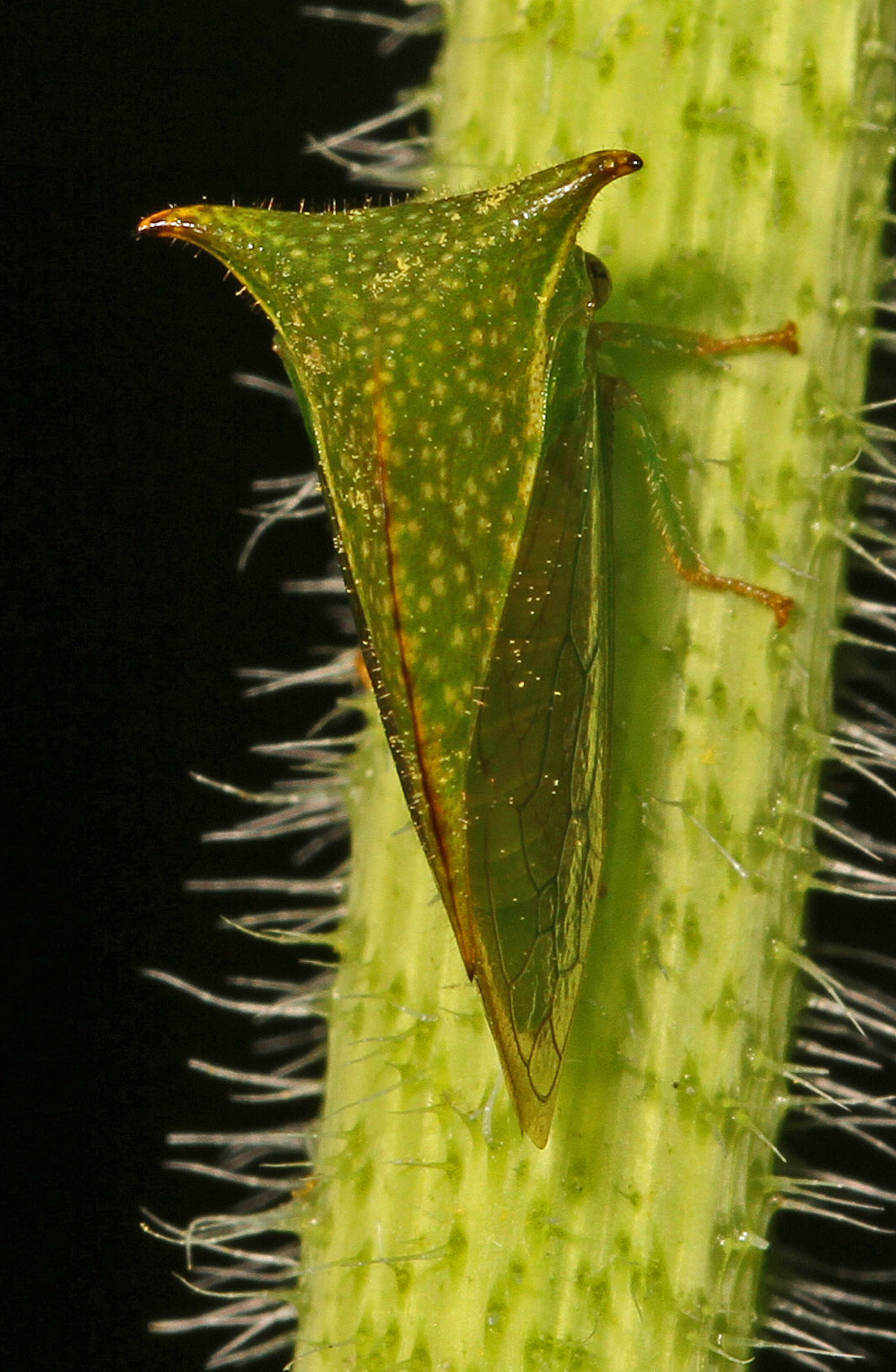
- Ceresa bubalus

Scientific classification
- Domain: Eukaryota
- Kingdom: Animalia
- Phylum: Arthropoda
- Class: Insecta
- Order: Hemiptera
- Suborder: Auchenorrhyncha
- Family: Membracidae
- Tribe: Ceresini
- Genus: Ceresa; Amyot & Serville, 1843

= Ceresa =

Buffalo treehoppers

Genus of true bugs

Ceresa, commonly known as buffalo treehoppers, is a genus of treehoppers. It contains about 16 species.

- Ceresa albescens
- Ceresa albidosparsa
- Ceresa alta
- Ceresa ancora
- Ceresa basalis
- Ceresa borealis
- Ceresa diceros
- Ceresa festina
- Ceresa franciscanus
- Ceresa inermis
- Ceresa lutea
- Ceresa pacifica
- Ceresa palmeri
- Ceresa stimulea
- Ceresa tauriniformis
