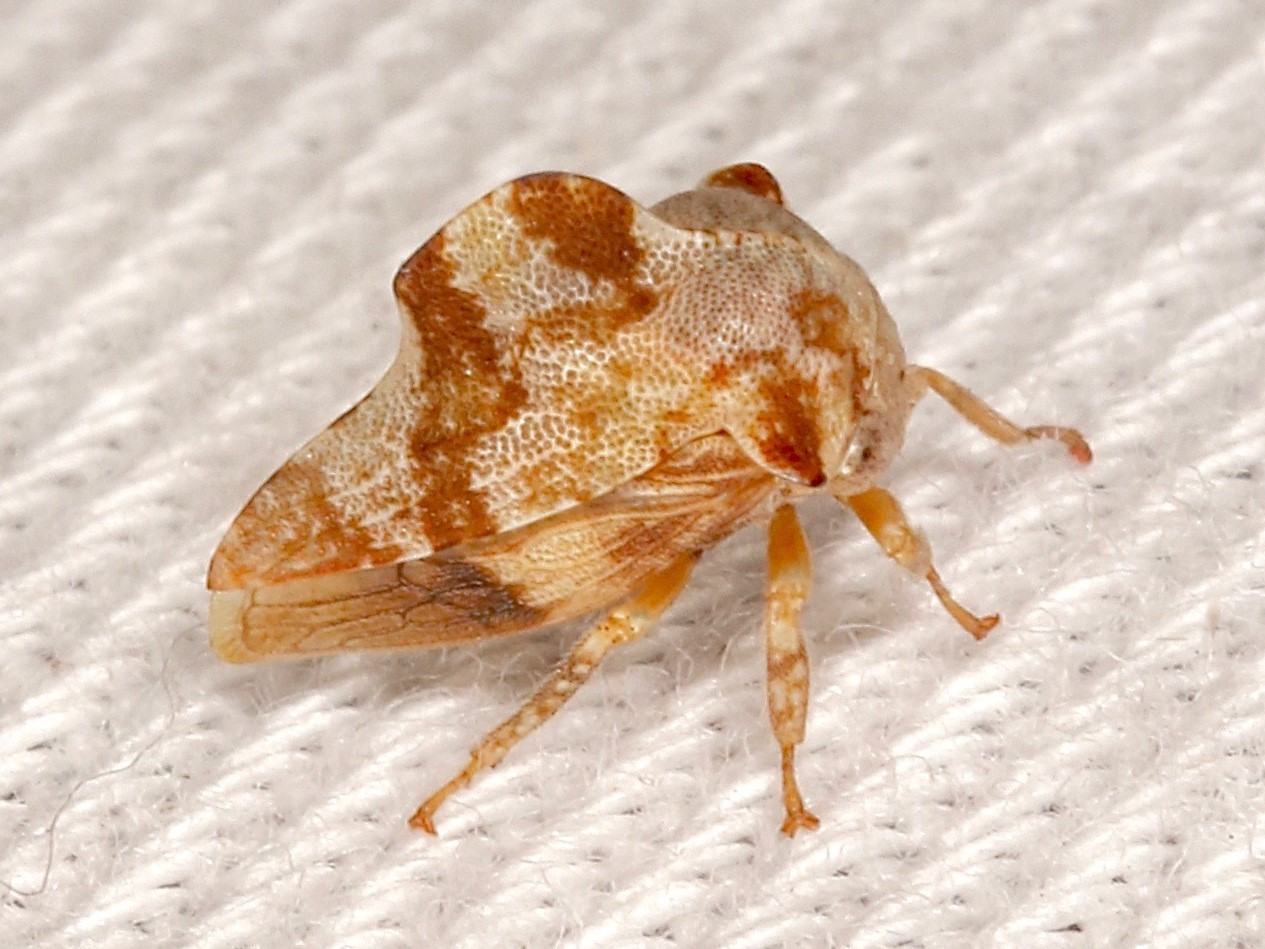
- Telamonanthe pulchella

Scientific classification
- Domain: Eukaryota
- Kingdom: Animalia
- Phylum: Arthropoda
- Class: Insecta
- Order: Hemiptera
- Suborder: Auchenorrhyncha
- Family: Membracidae
- Genus: Telamonanthe; Baker, 1907

= Telamonanthe =

Genus of insects

Telamonanthe is a genus of treehoppers. It belongs to the tribe Telamonini in the subfamily Smiliinae.

== Species ==
There are three species recognised in the genus Telamonanthe:

- Telamonanthe pulchella
- Telamonanthe rileyi
- Telamonanthe turbinella
