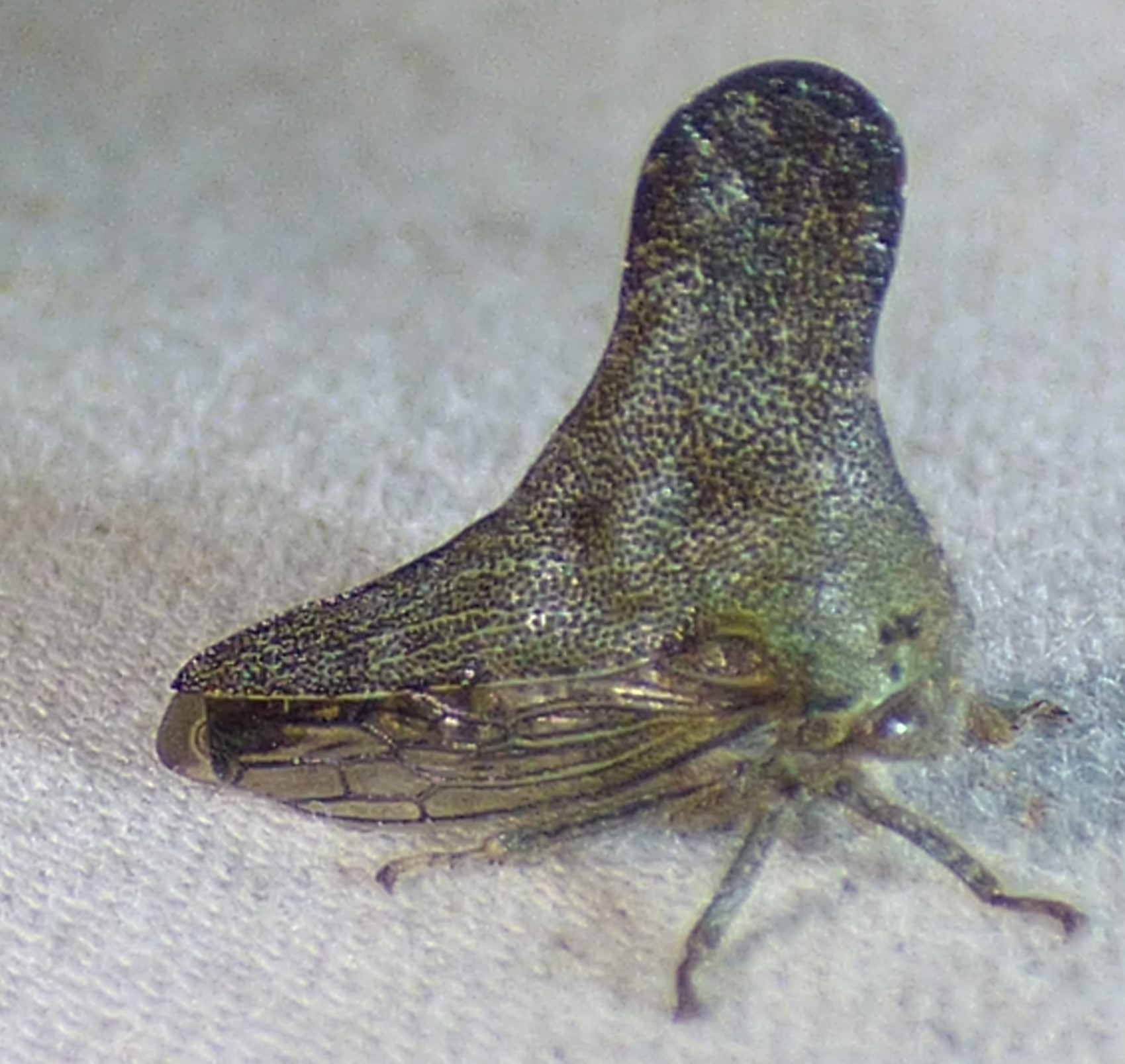
- Telonaca alta

Scientific classification
- Kingdom: Animalia
- Phylum: Arthropoda
- Class: Insecta
- Order: Hemiptera
- Suborder: Auchenorrhyncha
- Family: Membracidae
- Genus: Telonaca; Ball, 1918

= Telonaca =

Genus of insects

Telonaca is a genus of treehopper belonging to the tribe Telamonini in the subfamily Smiliinae. It has only two described species.

- Telonaca alta
- Telonaca ramona
