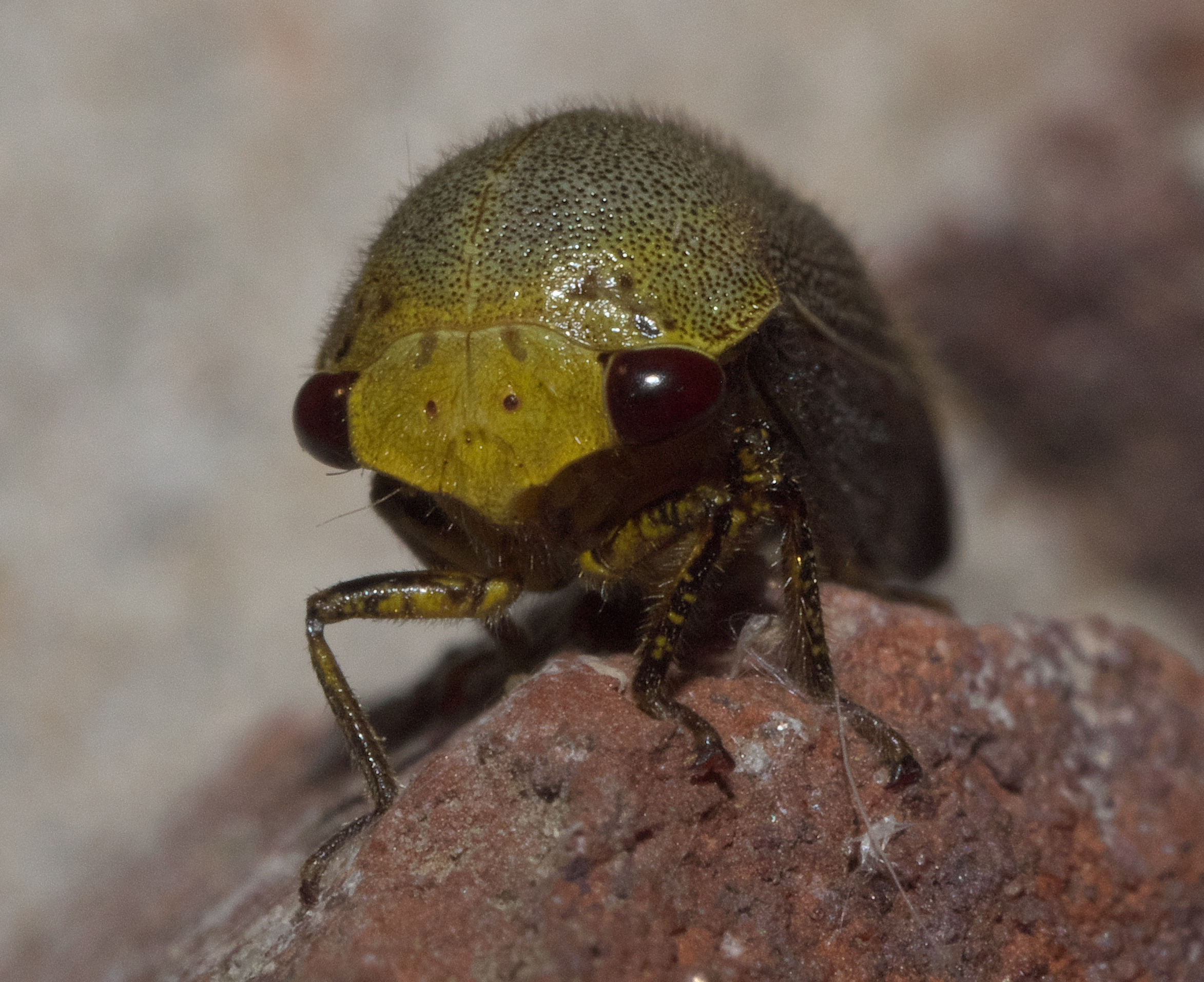
- Carynota mera

Scientific classification
- Domain: Eukaryota
- Kingdom: Animalia
- Phylum: Arthropoda
- Class: Insecta
- Order: Hemiptera
- Suborder: Auchenorrhyncha
- Family: Membracidae
- Genus: Carynota

= Carynota =

Genus of insects

Carynota is a genus of treehopper belonging to the family Membracidae and the subfamily Smiliinae. There are 4 described species in Carynota.

== Species ==
- Carynota maculata
- Carynota marmorata
- Carynota mera
- Carynota stupida
