= Lallemandia =

Scientific classification
- Domain: Eukaryota
- Kingdom: Animalia
- Phylum: Arthropoda
- Class: Insecta
- Order: Hemiptera
- Suborder: Auchenorrhyncha
- Family: Membracidae
- Genus: Lallemandia; Funkhouser, 1922
- Species: L. nodosa

Binomial name
- Lallemandia nodosa Funkhouser, 1922

Genus of insects

Lallemandia is a genus of treehoppers in the family Membracidae. It contains only one species, Lallemandia nodosa.
