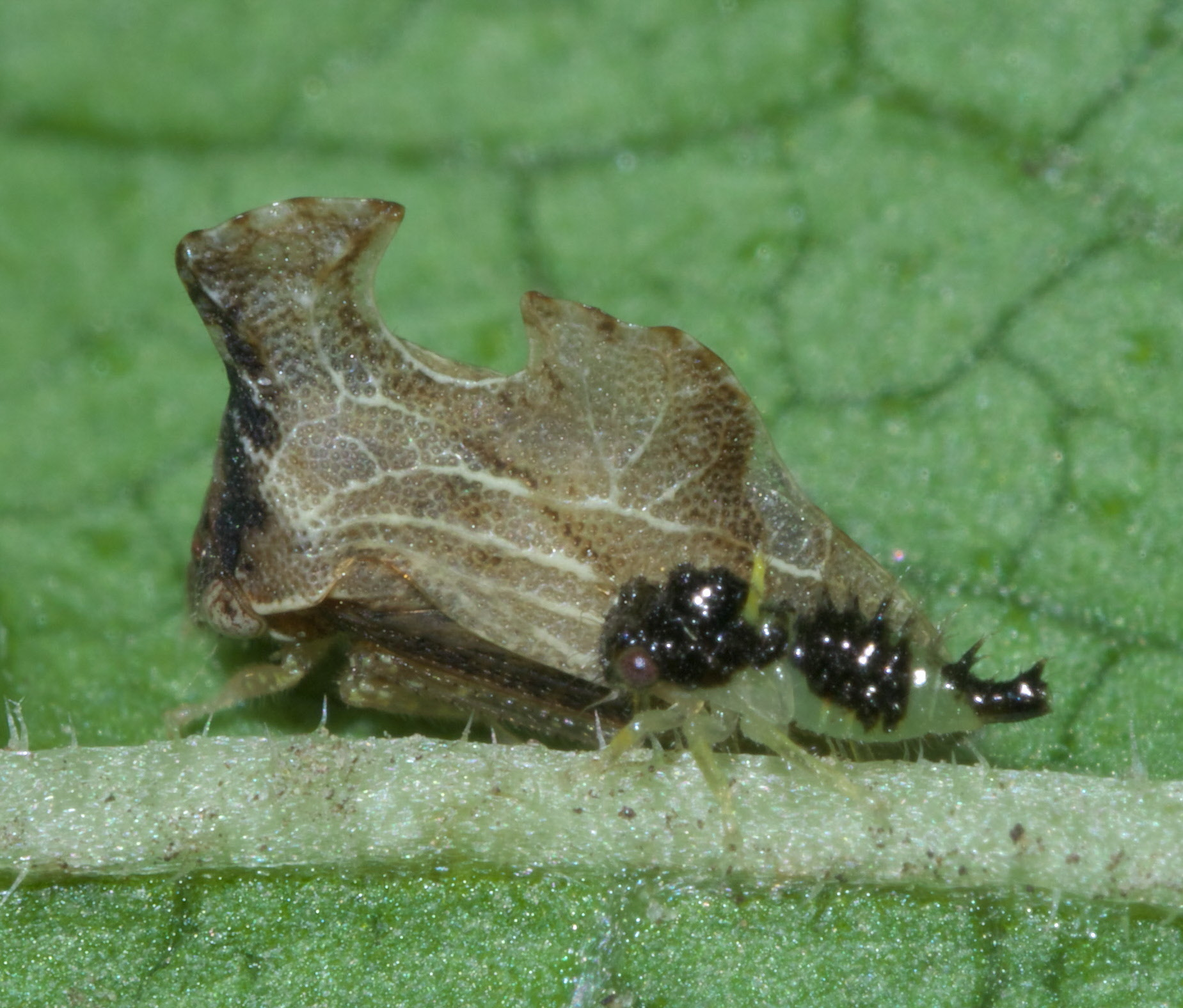
- Entylia

Scientific classification
- Domain: Eukaryota
- Kingdom: Animalia
- Phylum: Arthropoda
- Class: Insecta
- Order: Hemiptera
- Suborder: Auchenorrhyncha
- Family: Membracidae
- Subfamily: Smiliinae
- Tribe: Polyglyptini

= Polyglyptini =

Tribe of treehoppers

Polyglyptini is a tribe of treehoppers in the family Membracidae. There are at least four genera and about nine described species in Polyglyptini.

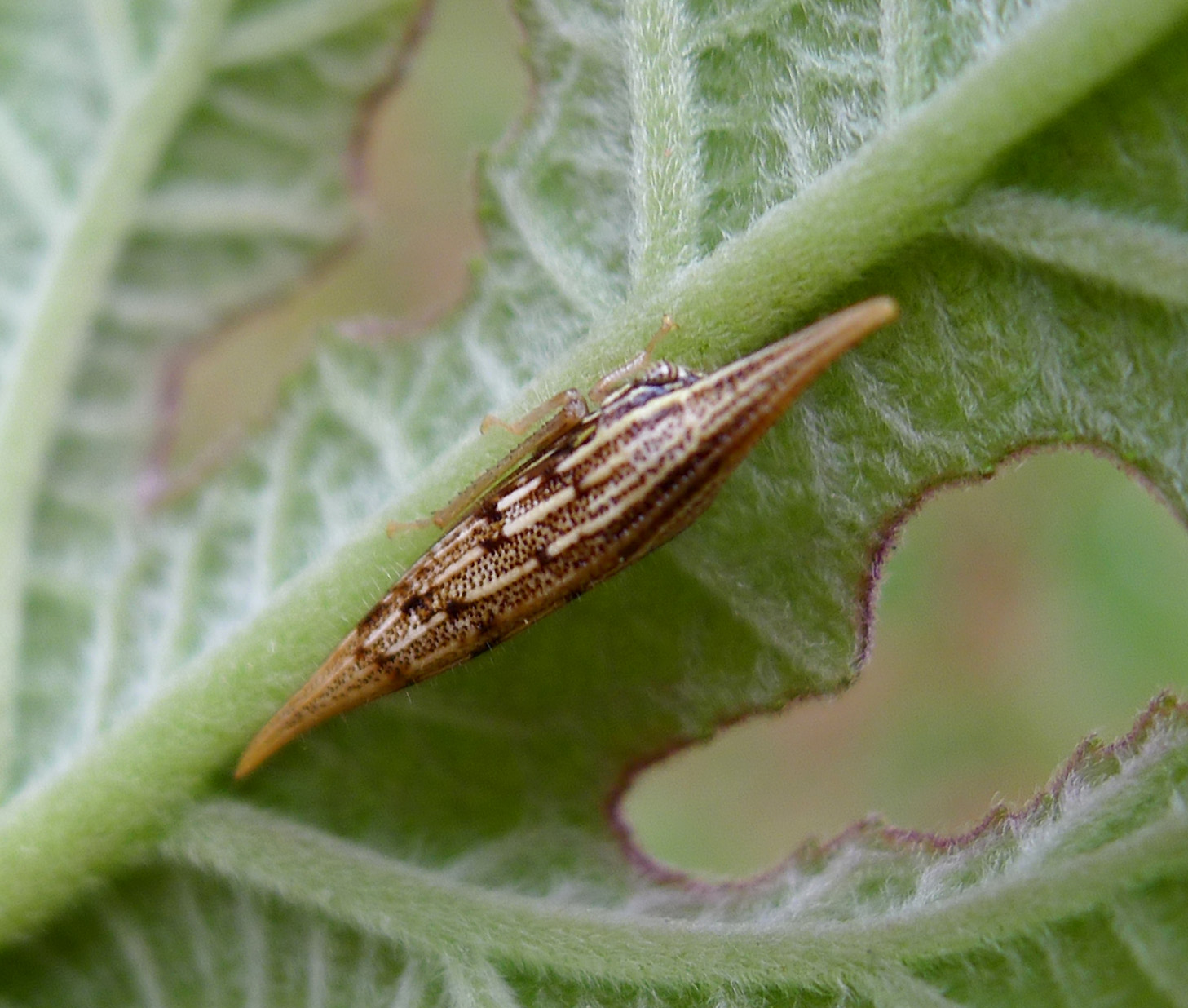
Polyglypta

== Genera ==
These four genera belong to the tribe Polyglyptini:

- Bryantopsis Ball, 1937^{c g b}
- Entylia Germar, 1833^{c g b}
- Polyglypta Burmeister, 1835^{c g b}
- Publilia Stål, 1866^{c g b}

Data sources: i = ITIS, c = Catalogue of Life, g = GBIF, b = Bugguide.net
