= Oreste =

1734 opera by Handel

George Frideric Handel

Oreste ("Orestes", HWV A11, HG 48/102) is an opera by George Frideric Handel in three acts. The libretto was anonymously adapted from Giangualberto Barlocci's L'Oreste (1723, Rome), which was in turn adapted from Euripides' Iphigeneia in Tauris.

The opera is a pasticcio (pastiche), meaning that the music of the arias was assembled from earlier works, mainly other operas and cantatas also by Handel. The recitatives and parts of the dances are the only parts composed specifically for this work. Handel had put together similar works before, fitting the music of pre-existent arias to new words, but this was the first time he had made an opera in this way using entirely his music. He assembled a collection of his arias from the previous years, ranging from Agrippina of 1709 to Sosarme of 1732, binding the pre-existent music seamlessly together with the newly-written recitatives to create a new musical drama.

The opera is in Italian, although it was written and performed in England. The lead role was written for the castrato Giovanni Carestini. It is now performed by either a countertenor or soprano.

== Performance history ==
The opera was first performed at Covent Garden Theatre on 18 December 1734. A notice in the London press said :

Last Night their Majesties were at the Theatre Royal in Covent-Garden, to see the Opera of Orestes, which was perform'd with great Applause. (London Bee, 19 December 1734).

The work was performed three times in Handel's lifetime and was first revived in 1988. Among other performances, Oreste received a staging by the English Bach Festival at the Linbury Studio Theatre in the Royal Opera House, London, in 2000, and was staged for the first time in the USA at Juilliard School in 2003. The work was staged by the Royal Opera, London, at Wilton's Music Hall in 2016 and by the Handel Festival, Halle in 2018.

== Roles ==
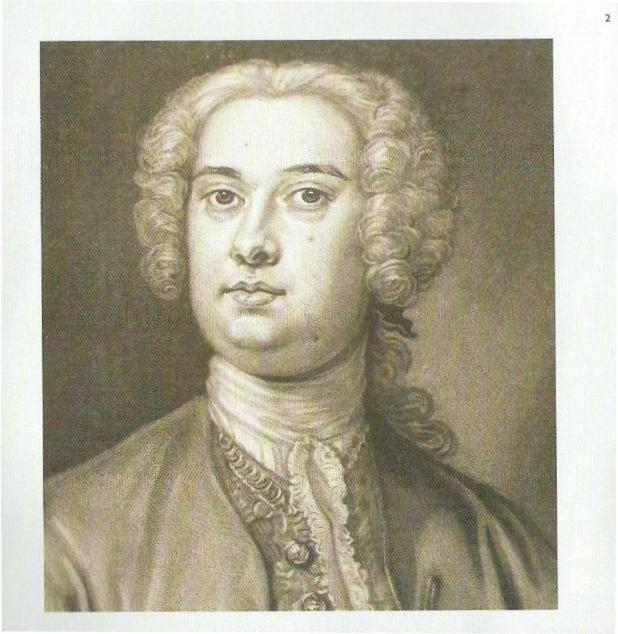
Giovanni Carestini, who created the role of Oreste

Roles, voice types, and premiere cast
Role	Voice type	Premiere Cast, 18 December 1734
Oreste	mezzo-soprano castrato	Giovanni Carestini
Ifigenia, priestess of Diana	soprano	Cecilia Young
Ermione, Oreste's wife	soprano	Anna Maria Strada del Pò
Pilade, faithful friend and companion of Oreste	tenor	John Beard
Filotete, captain of King Toante's guard	contralto	Maria Caterina Negri
Toante, king of the Tauri	bass	Gustavus Waltz

== Synopsis ==
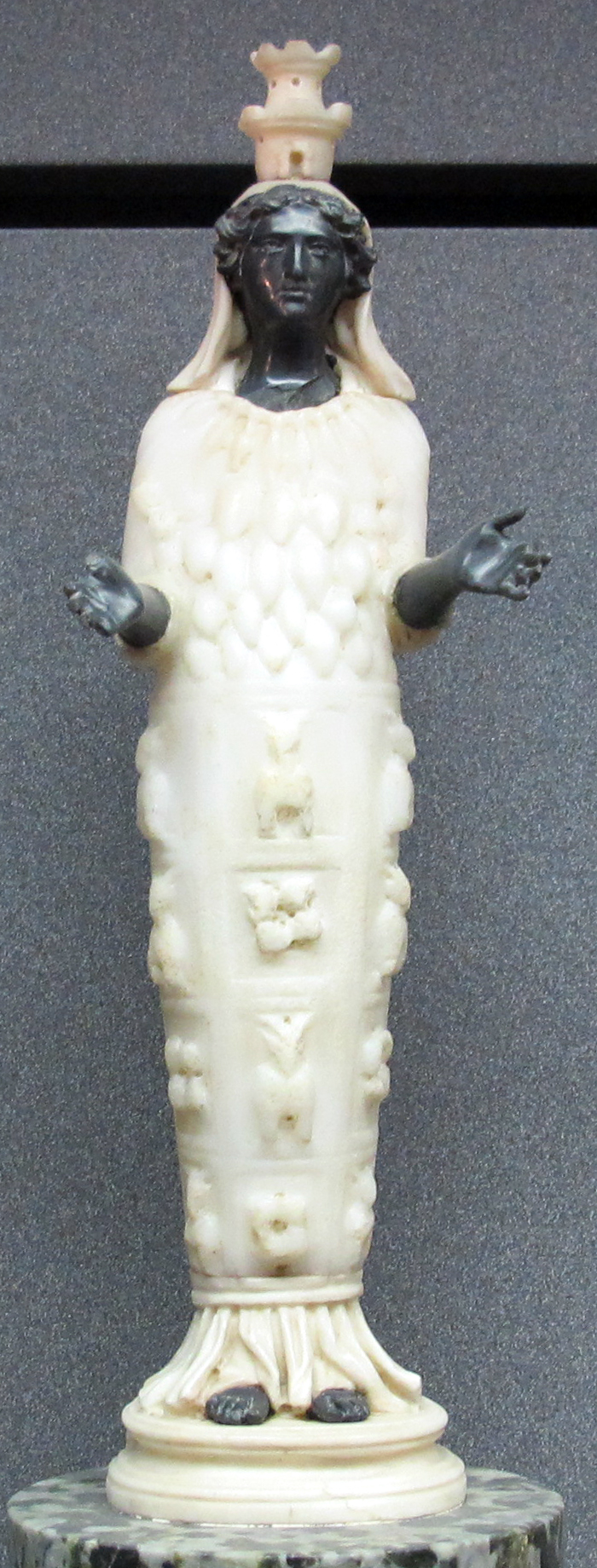
Statuette of the Artemis (Diana) of Ephesus

- Scene: Tauris (modern day Crimea), in legendary antiquity

Years before the action of the opera, the young princess Ifigenia narrowly escaped death by sacrifice at the hands of her father, Agamemnon. At the last moment the goddess Diana, to whom the sacrifice was to be made, intervened and replaced Ifigenia on the altar with a deer, saving the girl and sweeping her off to Tauris. She has since been made a priestess at the temple of Diana in Tauris, a position in which she has the gruesome task of ritually sacrificing foreigners who land on King Toante's shores. Ifigenia hates her forced religious servitude and has had a prophetic dream about her younger brother Oreste and believes that he is dead. Meanwhile, Oreste has killed his mother Clytemnestra to avenge his father Agamemnon with assistance from his friend Pilade. He becomes haunted by the furies for committing the crime and goes through periodic fits of madness.

To this mythological material adapted from Euripides' Iphigenia in Tauris, Oreste adds the character of Oreste's wife Hermione, searching for him to aid him in his quest for restoration of his mind and peace of spirit, and also adds another character, Filotete, not present in the Euripides play.

=== Act 1 ===
Sacred Grove of Diana with a statue of the goddess - Oreste is tormented both by personal remorse for the killing of his mother and by the furies. Wandering the world in a restless search for relief, he has been shipwrecked on the coast of Tauris. He prays to the goddess for peace and forgiveness (Aria:Pensieri, voi mi tormentate). Ifigenia enters with a retinue of priests and does not recognise the stranger as her brother, whom she has not seen since childhood and she believes to be dead (Aria:Bella calma). It is Ifigenia's duty to sacrifice strangers who appear in the kingdom to Diana, but she does not want to do this and advises the stranger to take refuge in the temple of Diana, to which he agrees (Aria:Agitato da fiere tempeste). Filotete, captain of King Toante's guard, who is in love with Ifigenia and she with him, arrives and promises to help her to try to save the young stranger from death, for which Ifigenia is grateful (Aria: Dirti vorrei). Left alone, Filotete is happy that Ifigenia trusts him to help her and looks forward to her love as his reward (Aria:Orgogliosetto va l'augelletto).

A seaport with ships at anchor - Ermione has arrived in Tauris, in search of her husband Oreste (Aria:Io sperai di veder il tuo volto). She is met by Pilade, faithful friend of Oreste, but they are both arrested by Filotete as foreigners. King Toante decrees that according to law both Ermione and Pilade must be put to death as human sacrifices to the goddess Diana, but changes his mind, and orders that Pilade only will be killed. Left alone with Ermione, he tells her he has fallen in love with her and will save her life if she will be his. She refuses this offer, whereupon he warns her to beware his wrath (Aria:Pensa ch'io sono). Left alone, Ermione laments her fate (Aria: Dite pace e fulminate). The act concludes with a set of dances for the Grecian sailors.

=== Act 2 ===
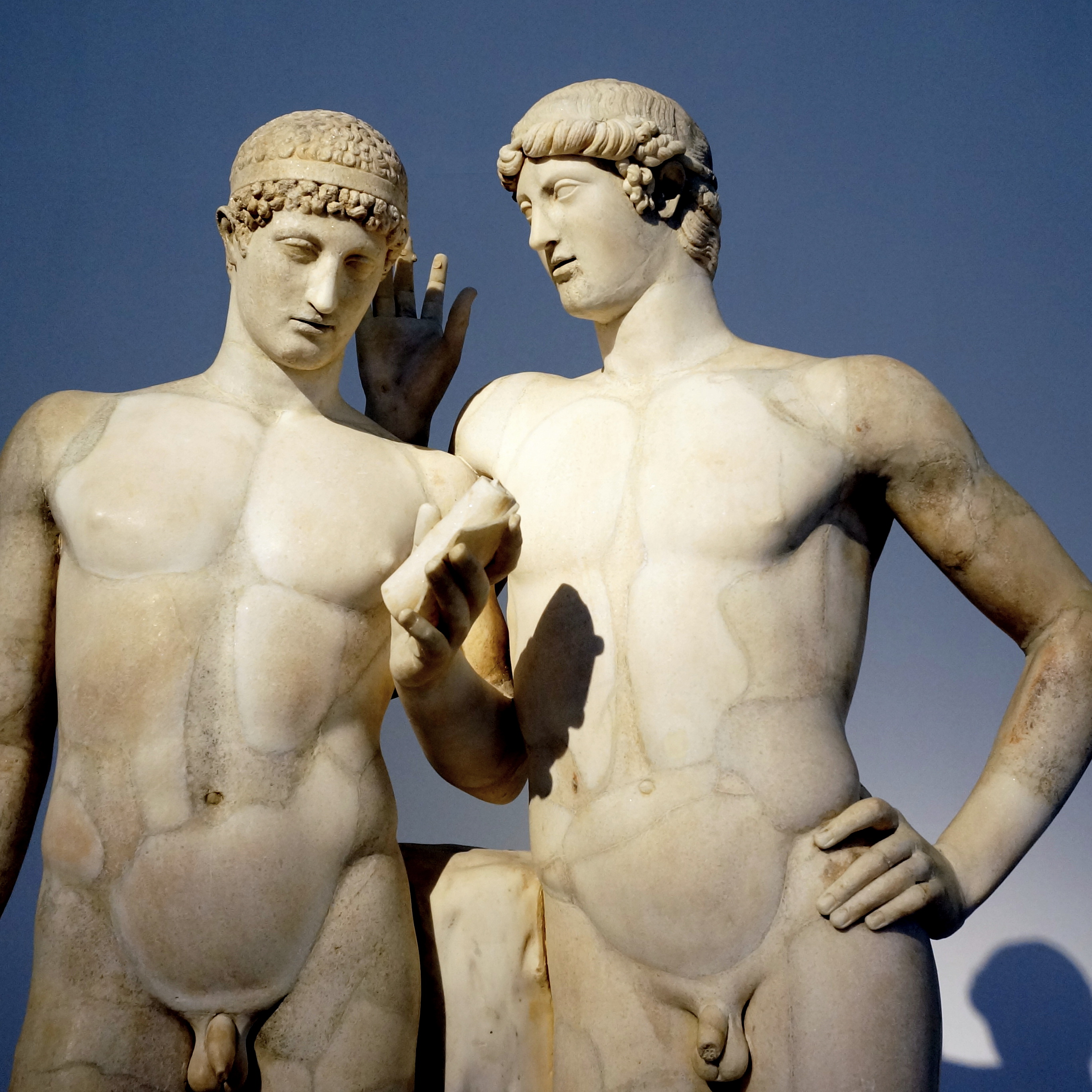
Orestes and Pylades, attributed to Pasiteles school

The forecourt of the temple of Diana - The act begins with an introductory sinfonia. Oreste is in the temple where he has taken refuge at Ifigenia's advice when he sees his friend Pilade in chains, dragged in ready to be sacrificed to the goddess. Oreste swears he will fight to save his beloved friend (Aria:Empio, se mi dai vita). Ifigenia intervenes however, and capitalising on Filotete's love for her, persuades him to allow Oreste to leave the temple freely (Aria:Se'l caro figlio). Oreste is reluctant to leave Pilade in danger but Pilade insists Oreste save himself (Aria:Caro amico, a morte io vo), and is then led away. In an accompanied recitative and aria, Oreste rails against the gods for their cruelty (Aria:Un interrotto affetto).

Royal garden with a gate that leads to the sea - Ifigenia shows Oreste the way to the sea and urges him to flee (Aria:Sento nell'alma). Alone, Oreste expresses his thanks to the gods for sending him the "noble virgin" who has rescued him but feels guilty for leaving his friend Pilade in danger of death (Aria:Dopo l'orrore). Ermione has traced Oreste's steps and is overjoyed to have found her husband (Aria:Vola l'augello). King Toante enters to see them embracing and orders them both to be executed. Oreste and Ermione take a loving farewell of each other (Duet:Ah, mia cara). A set of dances concludes the act.

=== Act 3 ===
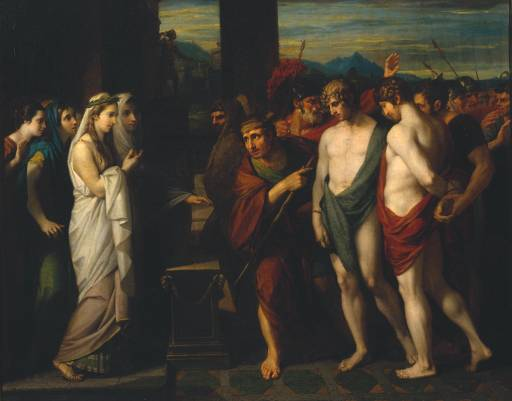
Pylades and Orestes Brought as Victims before Iphigenia by Benjamin West, 1766

The King's chamber - Toante offers to Ermione that he will free both her and Oreste if she will be his (Aria:Tu di pieta mi spogli.) She scorns this offer, preferring chains and death, and, left alone, laments her cruel destiny (Aria: Piango dolente il sposo).

The temple of Diana with an altar and statue - Ifigenia, whose duty it will be to ritually sacrifice the human victims, wishes she could die instead (Aria:Mi lagnerò, tacendo). Oreste is led in to be sacrificed and Ifigenia now recognises him as her brother. Ermione and then the King arrive and she begs him for mercy, as does Pilade who offers to die in Oreste's place. Toante refuses these pleas, even when Ifigenia reveals that Oreste is her brother. The King commands her to slay both Oreste and Pilade, but Ifigenia threatens to kill him instead. She is supported in this by Filotete. Combat ensues; the King is killed. Human sacrifice will now be ended, brother and sister, husband and wife can be re-united. Oreste expresses his joy (Aria: In mille dolci modi). A suite of dances follows, then a concluding chorus as all celebrate the fortunate outcome of events.

== Context and analysis ==
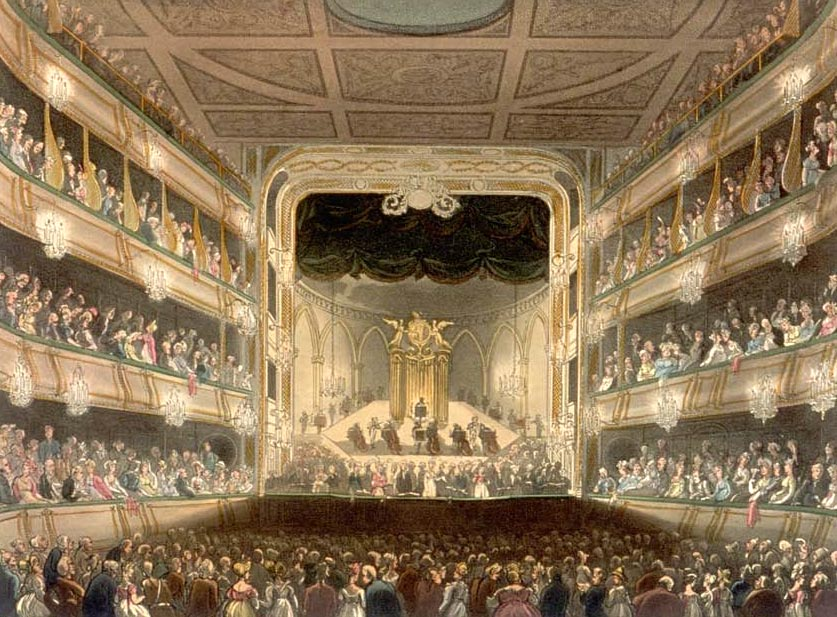
A picture of the theatre at Covent Garden where Oreste was first performed

The German-born Handel, after spending some of his early career composing operas and other pieces in Italy, settled in London, where in 1711 he had brought Italian opera for the first time with his opera Rinaldo. A tremendous success, Rinaldo created a craze in London for Italian opera seria, a form focused overwhelmingly on solo arias for the star virtuoso singers. In 1719, Handel was appointed music director of an organisation called the Royal Academy of Music (unconnected with the present day London conservatoire), a company under royal charter to produce Italian operas in London. Handel was not only to compose operas for the company but hire the star singers, supervise the orchestra and musicians, and adapt operas from Italy for London performance.

The Royal Academy of Music collapsed at the end of the 1728 - 29 season, partly due to the huge fees paid to the star singers. Handel went into partnership with John James Heidegger, the theatrical impresario who held the lease on the King's Theatre in the Haymarket where the operas were presented and started a new opera company with a new prima donna, Anna Strada.

In 1733, a second opera company, The Opera of the Nobility was set up to rival Handel's, employing several of Handel's former star singers including the celebrated castrato Senesino. Handel's lease on the King's Theatre in the Haymarket expired at the end of the 1733 - 34 season, and the Opera of the Nobility moved into what had been Handel's artistic home for years. In addition to Senesino, the rival opera company had also hired the renowned castrato Farinelli, who created a sensation. These were considered serious setbacks for Handel as the French author Antoine François Prévost wrote in 1734:

He has so suffered great losses and written so many wonderful operas, which proved to be utter failures, that he will be forced to leave London and return to his home country

but, undeterred, Handel moved into a new theatre, the Theatre Royal Covent Garden, built by John Rich largely on the proceeds of the extremely successful The Beggar's Opera which had parodied Italian opera of the kind Handel supplied for London. Rich had equipped his new theatre with the latest technology in stage machinery and also employed a troupe of dancers, which had not been the case at the King's Theatre in the Haymarket. Handel opened his first season at Covent Garden with a re-working of his earlier Il Pastor Fido with an entirely new prologue, Terpsichore, featuring the internationally famous French dancer Marie Sallé. The pasticcio Oreste, which followed, also features dances unlike the operas Handel had previously composed for London. Anna Strada, who alone of the stars of Handel's previous operas had not defected to the rival opera company, was in the cast of Oreste, as she was in all of Handel's large-scale vocal works from 1729 to 1737. She was joined by celebrated castrato Carestini, of whom 18th century musicologist Charles Burney wrote:

"His voice was at first a powerful and clear soprano, which afterwards changed into the fullest, finest, and deepest counter-tenor that has perhaps ever been heard... Carestini's person was tall, beautiful, and majestic. He was a very animated and intelligent actor, and having a considerable portion of enthusiasm in his composition, with a lively and inventive imagination, he rendered every thing he sung interesting by good taste, energy, and judicious embellishments. He manifested great agility in the execution of difficult divisions from the chest in a most articulate and admirable manner. It was the opinion of Hasse, as well as of many other eminent professors, that whoever had not heard Carestini was inacquainted with the most perfect style of singing."

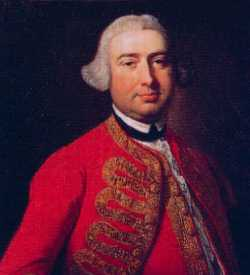
John Beard

Also joining the cast of Oreste was seventeen-year-old tenor John Beard, who in this season began a collaboration with Handel that lasted until the end of the composer's life, creating many roles in his works. An acquaintance of Handel's wrote to her friend at this time:

A Scholar of Mr Gates, Beard, (who left the Chappell last Easter) shines in the Opera of Covent Garden & Mr Hendell is so full of his Praises that he says he will surprise the Town with his performances before the Winter is over.

The opera is scored for two oboes, two horns, strings, lute, and continuo (cello, lute, harpsichord).

== Recordings ==
Mary-Ellen Nesi (Oreste), Maria Mitsopoulou (Ermione), Mata Katsuli (Iphigenia), Antonis Koroneos (Pilade), Petros Magoulas (Toante), Nicholas Spanos (Filotete).Camerata Stuttgart, George Petrou, conductor. CD:MDG Cat:LC 6768 Recorded 2003.
