= Iphigenia in Tauris (Goethe) =

1779 play by Johann Wolfgang von Goethe

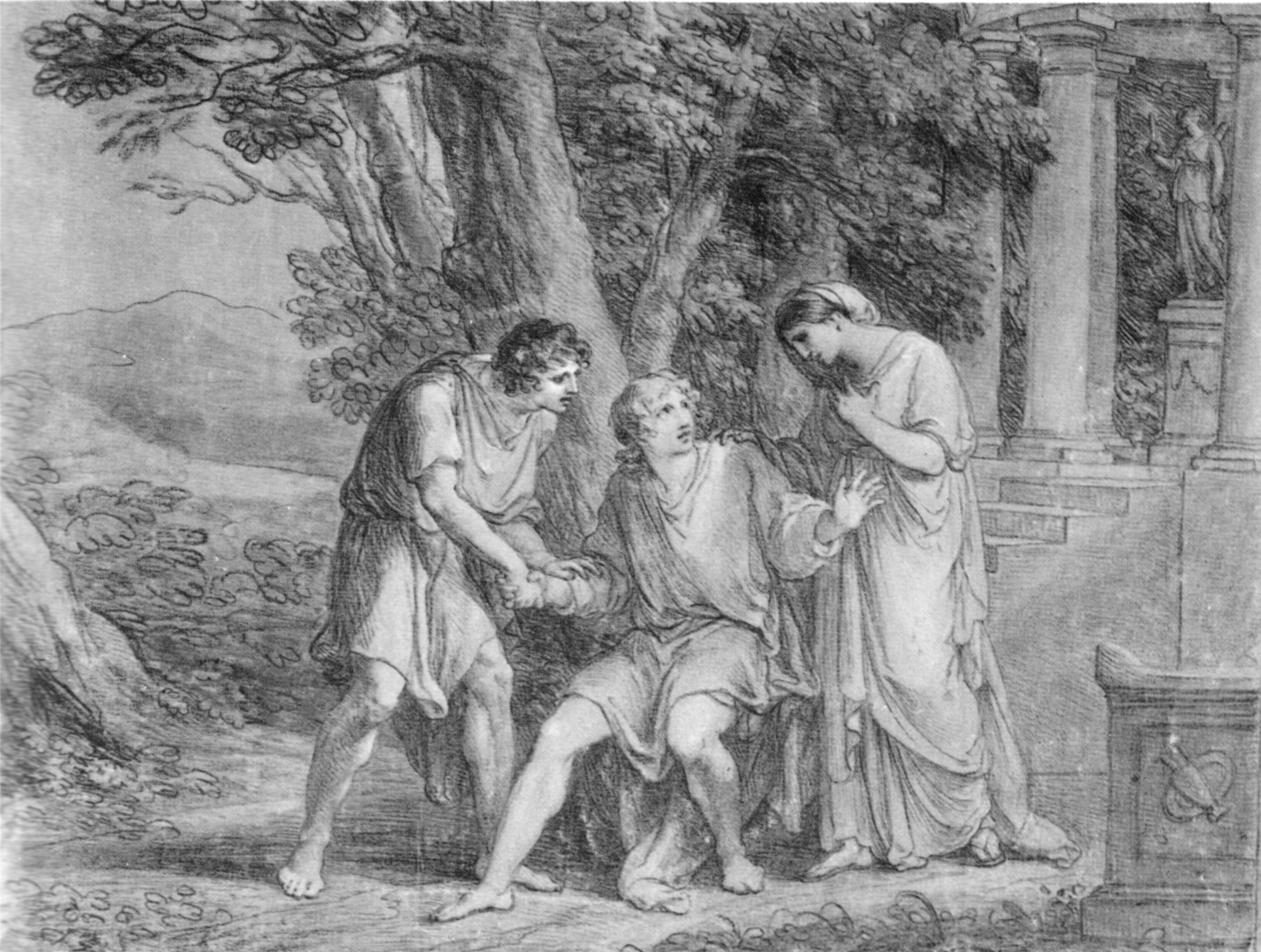
- Scene from Iphigenia in Tauris (1802 version première in Weimar), with Goethe as Orestes in the centre (Act III, Scene 3) (drawing by Angelica Kauffman)
- Original language: German
- Written by: Johann Wolfgang von Goethe
- Based on: Iphigenia in Tauris by Euripides
- Characters: Iphigenia; Thoas, king of the Tauri; Orestes; Pylades; Arkas
- Genre: Tragedy
- Setting: Diana's temple grove at Taurica, in the aftermath of the Trojan War

Premiere
- Date: April 6, 1779
- Place: Ducal private theater in Weimar

Iphigenia in Tauris (German: Iphigenie auf Tauris) is a reworking by the German polymath Johann Wolfgang von Goethe of the ancient Greek tragedy Ἰφιγένεια ἐν Ταύροις (Iphigeneia en Taurois) by Euripides. Euripides' title means "Iphigenia among the Taurians", whereas Goethe's title means "Iphigenia in Taurica", the country of the Tauri.

Goethe wrote the first version of his play in six weeks, and it was first performed on April 6, 1779, in prose form. He rewrote it in 1781, again in prose, and finally in 1786 in verse form. He took the manuscript of Iphigenia in Tauris with him on his famous Italian Journey.

== Background ==
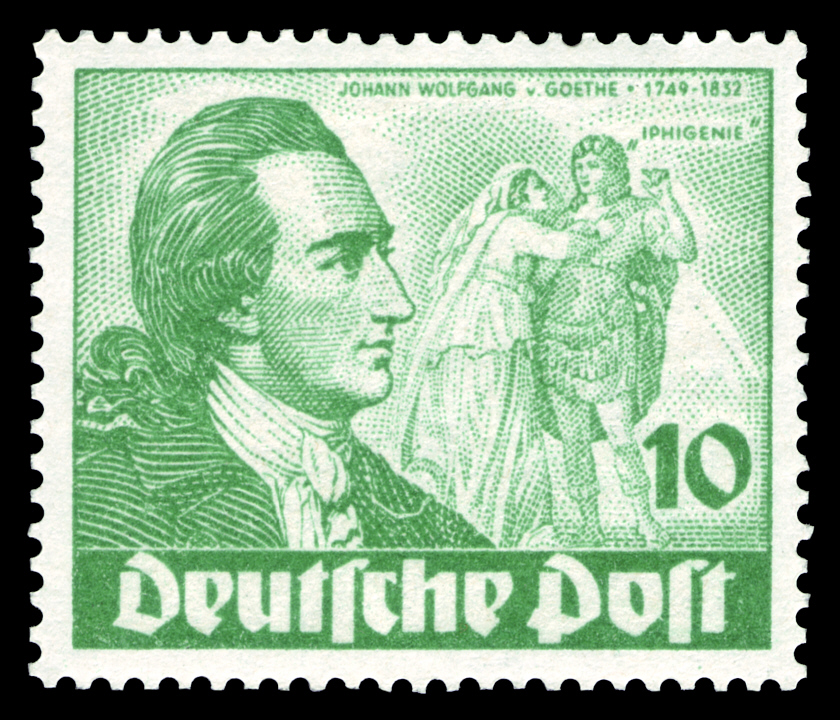
Iphigenie auf Taurus, painted by Georg Oswald May, as reproduced on a 1949 German 10-Pfennig postage stamp

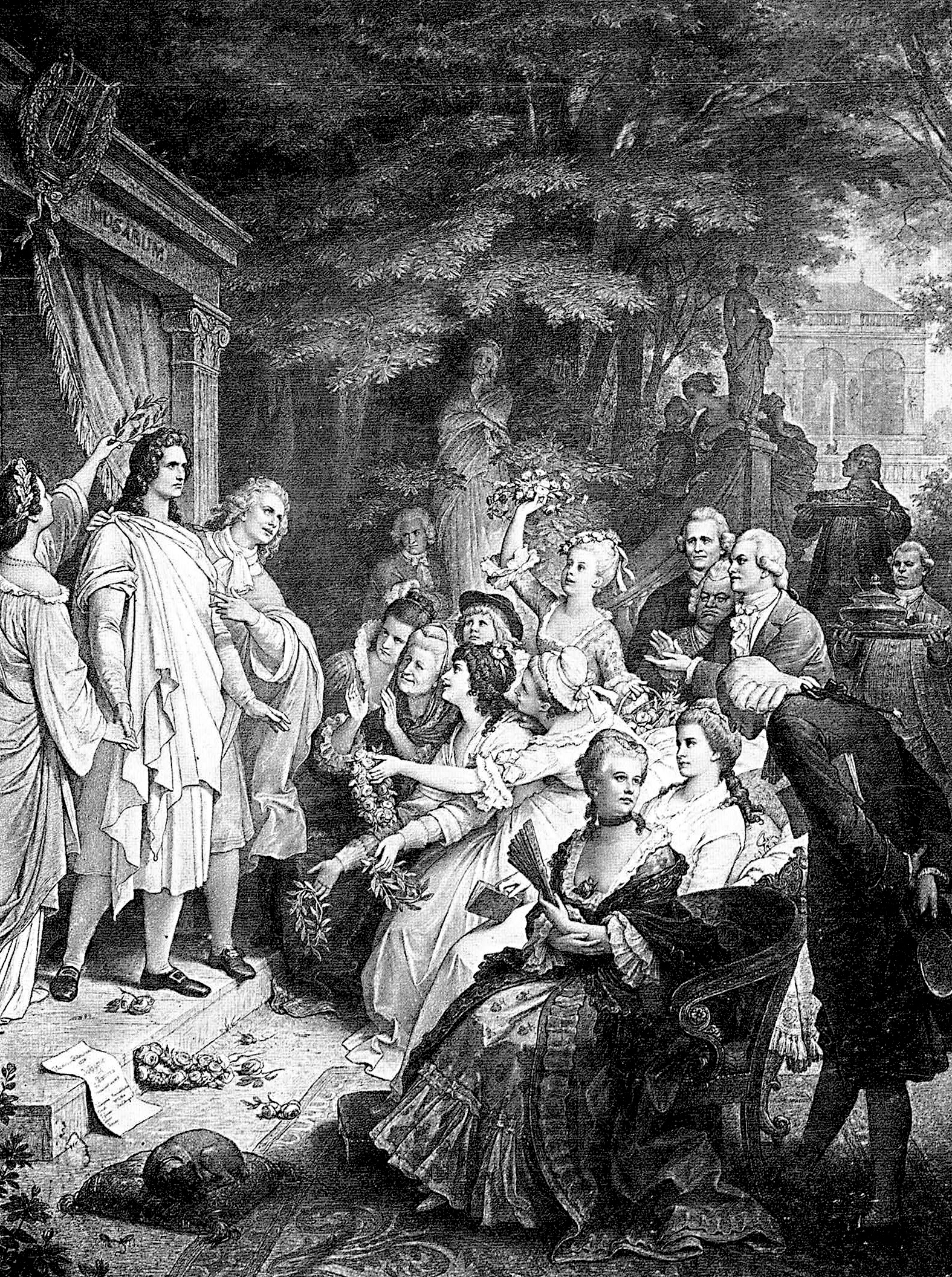
Performance of Iphigenia in Tauris featuring Goethe as Orestes, Karl August as Pylades, and Corona Schröter as Iphigenia

Beloved by the gods for his wisdom, the demigod Tantalus was once invited to their fellowship. Becoming boisterous whilst celebrating with them, he began to boast, and he stole the gods' nectar and ambrosia, their food of immortality. When the gods came to see Tantalus in turn, he tested their omniscience by offering his own son Pelops to them as their meal. Offended by the deception, the gods banished Tantalus from their community to Tartarus and cursed him and his family, the House of Atreus. This became known as the curse on the Tantalids, in which descendants from Tantalus in every subsequent generation were driven by revenge and hatred to the killing of their own family members.

Thus did Agamemnon, army commander and great-grandson of Tantalus, offer his eldest daughter Iphigenia to goddess Diana (in Greek known as Artemis) to ensure favourable winds for the voyage from Aulis, modern Avlida, to Troy, where he intended to wage war against Troy. In the mistaken belief that her husband Agamemnon had murdered their daughter Iphigenia, Clytemnestra then killed Agamemnon after his return from the Trojan War. As a result, Orestes and Electra, the brother and sister of Iphigenia, harboured a grudge against the mother over the murder of their father, and Orestes, with the help of Electra, murdered his mother Clytemnestra. Being now guilty of a murder, he too fell under the family curse. In an attempt to flee his impending fate of falling victim to revenge and of being killed for his crime, he fled. Consulting the Delphic Oracle of Apollo, he was told to bring "the sister" to Athens and that this would be the only way to lift the curse. Since he supposed his sister Iphigenia was already dead, Orestes assumed that the oracle must have meant Apollo's twin sister, the goddess Diana. He therefore planned to rob the statue of Diana from the temple in Tauris, and he set out with his old friend Pylades for the coast of Tauris.

== Synopsis ==
=== Act I ===
Scene 1: Since Diana saved her from death (her father Agamemnon chose to sacrifice her in return for a favourable wind for Troy), Iphigenia has been serving as her priestess on Tauris. Although she is grateful to the goddess, and although she is held in high regard by King Thoas and his people, she longs more and more to return to her homeland.

"And days together stand I on the shore, / seeking, in my soul, the land of Greece .."

She laments her life as a woman in a foreign land, recognising that her normal fate would have been to be tied to a husband.

"Woman's fate is lamentable ... / how narrow the limits to her happiness!"

She begs Diana to reunite her with her family:

"And rescue me, you who rescued me from death, / from this, the second death that I am living here."

Scene 2: Arkas, the confidant of Thoas, King of Tauris, announces the King's arrival. Iphigenia admits her homesickness to him. Arkas reminds her of all the good she has done in Tauris, for example, ending the custom of sacrificing all strangers on Diana's altar. He explains that the King is coming to ask for her hand, and he advises her to accept. Iphigenia declines: marriage would tie her to Tauris for ever.

Scene 3: Thoas makes his suit. Iphigenia justifies her refusal by her longing for Greece, and does her best to add other sound reasons, such as the curse that lies on her family, which condemns all the descendants of Tantalus to kill each other. She gives several examples. Thoas is not dissuaded, but Iphigenia now calls on Diana:

"Has not the goddess, who rescued me, / and she alone, the right to my dedicated life?"

Thoas threatens to reintroduce the old custom of human sacrifice, which she would be obliged to carry out, rather than allow her to leave.

Scene 4: Iphigenia prays to Diana: she places her faith in the goodness and justice of the Gods, and she begs her to spare her from having to sacrifice innocent victims.

=== Act II ===
Scene 1: Iphigenia's brother Orestes and his friend and cousin Pylades arrive, and we learn that they are following up an oracle of Apollo. Orestes has avenged his father by murdering his mother, and has been pursued ever since by the implacable Furies. So he has pleaded with Apollo to release him from their anger. Apollo has answered through his oracle at Delphi, saying that his guilt will be redeemed if he brings his sister back to Greece. He takes Apollo to mean his own sister, and so the two men have landed in Tauris to steal the statue of Diana from her temple. They have been discovered by the King's soldiers however, and taken prisoner. Orestes despairs, fearing that they will become human sacrifices. Pylades encourages him, telling him about the kindly priestess who does not kill prisoners. Nevertheless, Orestes feels that their mission is hopeless.

Scene 2: Iphigenia speaks with Pylades, who does not reveal his name. He pretends that he and Orestes are brothers, and that Orestes has killed their brother. Iphigenia questions him about Greece. He tells her of the fall of Troy and the death of many Greek heroes. His account increases her homesickness and her desire to see her father Agamemnon again. But Pylades tells her that Agamemnon has been murdered by his wife Clytemnestra and her lover Aegisthus, in revenge for Agamemnon's sacrifice of his daughter. Iphigenia leaves in dismay.

=== Act III ===
Scene 1: Iphigenia promises Orestes, whose name she still does not know, to do all in her power to save him and Pylades from being sacrificed to Diana. She asks about Agamemnon's children (her siblings). Orestes tells her of Clytemnestra's murder, stabbed by Orestes at Electra's urging, and reveals his true identity, because he cannot bear Iphigenia's distress at this news: Let there be truth between us: I am Orestes. Iphigenia is happy to have found her brother again, and makes herself known in turn. Orestes decides nevertheless that he should die to appease the Furies; Iphigenia and Pylades should save themselves. He keeps the oracle's words to himself. At the end of the scene he falls unconscious to the ground.

Scene 2: Orestes has a vision of Hades. He sees his dead forebears in the Tantalus line happily forgiven in the underworld. This vision perhaps contributes to his healing, since it reveals to him the possibility of forgiveness after death.

Scene 3: Orestes wakes, but still believes himself to be in Hades, and thinks that Iphigenia and Pylades have descended there too. He pities his friend and wishes that his sister Electra were also in the underworld, so that she too can be free of the curse. Iphigenia and Pylades come to him, to heal him. In a prayer, Iphigenia thanks Diana and asks that Orestes may be released from the curse. Pylades tries to reason with him. When Orestes finally wakes from his dream (The curse is lifted, my heart assures me), he embraces Iphigenia, thanks the gods, and declares himself ready for action again. Pylades reminds them both of the need for haste which their danger imposes on them, and urges them to a quick conclusion.

=== Act IV ===
Scene 1: While Orestes and Pylades prepare a boat for their escape, Iphigenia is troubled by the need to deceive the King.

Scene 2: Arkas brings the King's command to hasten the sacrifice: Iphigenia tells him that the prisoner's bloodguilt has polluted the temple, and that she must first purify it. They argue over the King's right to command, and the priestess's right to interpret the will of the Goddess. Arkas leaves to report to the King.

Scene 3: Iphigenia reflects on her dilemma and the need to decide between the joy of escaping with her brother and the need to deceive and abandon the King, who has been good to her.

Scene 4: Pylades announces that Orestes is in good spirits, that the boat is ready, and urges her to hurry. She still hesitates, even though Pylades points out that she would have an even worse conscience if Orestes and he were killed.

Scene 5: In the Song of the Fates she recalls the pitiless vengeance of the Gods. Still, she adds a verse indicating that she does not entirely accept the Song of the Fates.

=== Act V ===
Scene 1: Arkas reports to Thoas, who commands him to bring the priestess before him at once.

Scene 2: Thoas reflects that his goodness to Iphigenia has encouraged her independence.

Scene 3: Iphigenia tells the angry Thoas that having experienced mercy when she was to be sacrificed, she is obliged to be merciful now. She argues that a woman's words can be as powerful as a man's sword; she tells him who the prisoners are, who she is, and of their plan to escape; and she appeals to his humanity. He begins to concede.

Scene 4: Orestes arrives, sword in hand, and urges Iphigenia to flee with him. She reveals that she has confessed to the King.

Scene 5: Pylades and Arkas arrive; the King orders a halt to the fighting.

Scene 6: Orestes offers himself in single combat, to decide their fate. Thoas himself is willing to accept the challenge, and is unpersuaded by Iphigenia's reasoning, especially because she had been party to the plan to steal the statue of Diana. Orestes explains his misunderstanding of the oracle's reference to a sister. The King reluctantly allows them to go; Iphigenia begs that they part as friends; and the King finally wishes them Farewell.

== Notable performances ==
On October 10, 1898, a Catalan translation by Joan Maragall was performed at Parc del Laberint d'Horta in Barcelona. It received a favorable review in the art journal Luz; A. L. de Barán particularly praised the performance of Clotilde Domus as Ifigenia.
