= Papyrus Oxyrhynchus 413 =

Greek papyrus fragment

Papyrus Oxyrhynchus 413 (P. Oxy. III 413 or P. Oxy. 413) is stage notes of an adaptation of Euripides' Iphigeneia in Tauris (Iφιγένεια ἡ ἐν Ταύροις). The setting is shifted from Greece to India. The anonymous adaptation is known as the Charition mime after the main character. It is of interest for some dialogue in an Indian language. The verso of the papyrus features an unrelated incomplete mime, the Moicheutria, involving a noblewoman plotting with her two slaves to poison an old man (possibly her husband).

The manuscript is held by the Bodleian Library as Ms. Gr. Class. b 4 (P). The manuscript is dated to the second century, possibly the Antonine period.
