= Crisus =

Son of Phocus in Greek mythology

In Greek mythology, Crisus /ˈkraɪsəs/ or Crissus /ˈkrɪsəs/ (Ancient Greek: Κρῖσος) was a son of Phocus and twin brother of Panopeus. With Antiphateia, daughter of Naubolus, he became father of Strophius; thus he was the grandfather of Pylades. He is also said to have founded the town of Crissa, which received its name from him. Through Panopeus, he was the uncle of Epeius of Phocis.
