= Pylades and Orestes Brought as Victims before Iphigenia =

Painting by Benjamin West

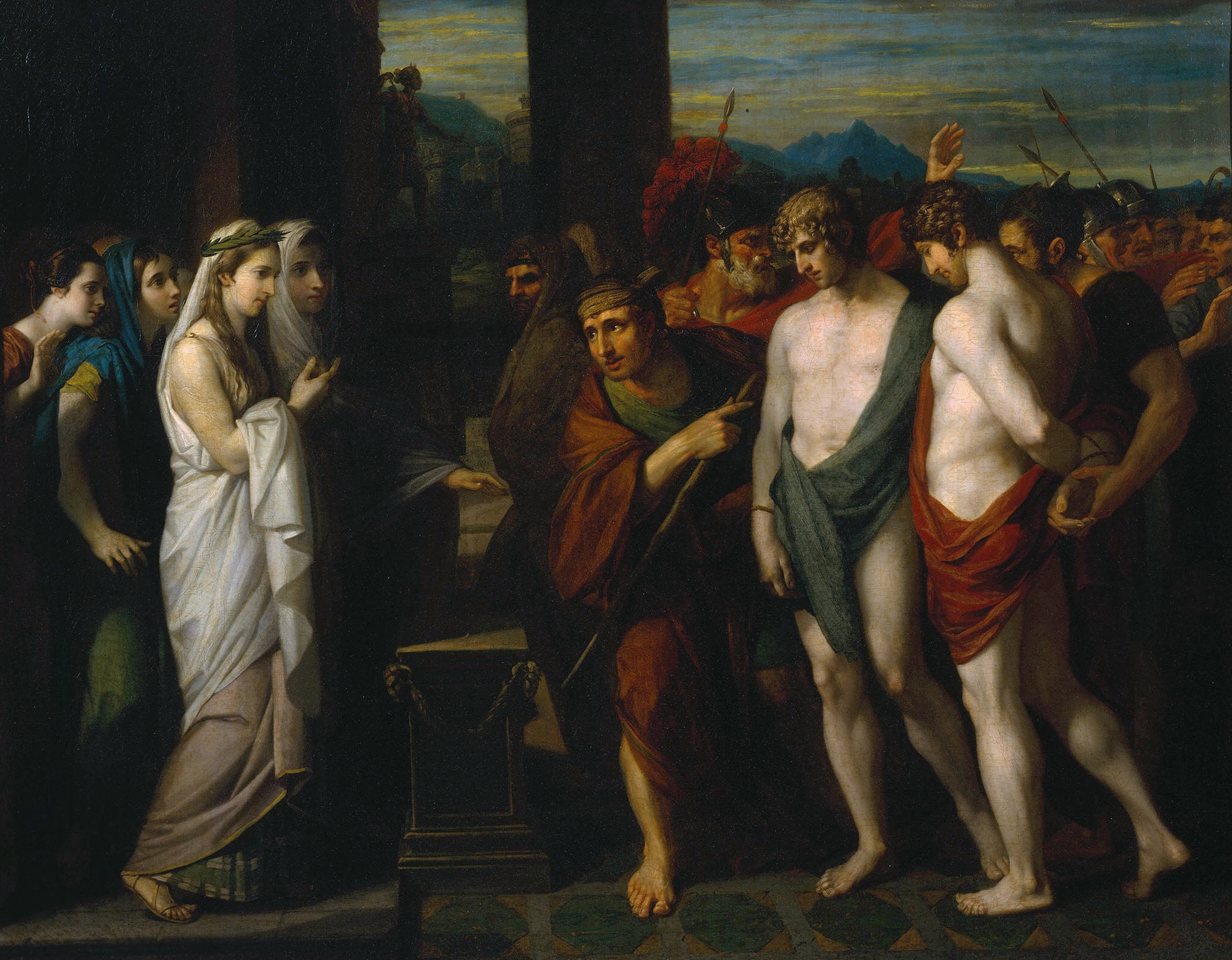
- Artist: Benjamin West
- Year: 1766
- Type: Oil on canvas, history painting
- Dimensions: 100.3 cm × 126.4 cm (39.5 in × 49.8 in)
- Location: Tate Britain, London

'Pylades and Orestes Brought as Victims before Iphigenia is a 1766 history painting by the Anglo-American artist Benjamin West. Inspired by the play Iphigenia in Tauris by the Ancient Greek writer Euripides, the Neoclassical composition features Iphigenia and her brother Orestes and his companion Pylades who have been captured by a shepherd after they are arrested for stealing a golden statue of Diana and are due to be executed. She recognises Orestes as her own relation.

The Pennsylvanian West had recently arrived in Britain from Italy where he has been strongly influenced by the classical tradition. The work was displayed with its companion piece The Continence of Scipio at the Exhibition of 1766 held by the Society of Artists of Great Britain in Pall Mall. The painting was owned by the art collector Sir George Beaumont who in 1826 gifted it to the new National Gallery. It is now in the collection of the Tate Britain in Pimlico.

== Bibliography ==
- Abrams, Ann Uhry. The Valiant Hero: Benjamin West and Grand-style History Painting. Smithsonian Institution Press, 1985.
- Dillenberger, John. Benjamin West. Trinity University Press, 1977
- Grossman, Lloyd. Benjamin West and the Struggle to be Modern. Merrell Publishers, 2015.
- Prown, Jules David. Art as Evidence: Writings on Art and Material Culture. Yale University Press, 2001.
