= Panopeus (mythology) =

Son of Phocus in Greek mythology

In Greek mythology, Panopeus (Ancient Greek: Πανοπεύς) was a son of Phocus by Asteria or Asterodia, and twin brother of Crisus. The two brothers were so inimical towards each other that they began fighting while still in their mother's womb, just like Proetus and Acrisius did.

== Mythology ==
Panopeus participated in Amphitryon's campaign against the Taphians and the Teleboans, and swore by the names of Athena and Ares not to lay his hand on any part of the booty. He, however, broke his oath; as punishment, his son Epeius became unwarlike, but still a good boxer and a skilled mechanic. Panopeus also had a daughter Aegle, who is mentioned as one of the consorts of Theseus: some say it was out of love for her that Theseus abandoned Ariadne on Naxos.

Panopeus was renowned as a skilled hunter and took part in the Calydonian boar hunt.

Panopeus was the eponym of the city Panope or Panopeus.
