= Charition mime =

Ancient Greek play

The Charition mime is a Greek theatre play found in Papyrus Oxyrhynchus 413, a possibly incomplete and untitled manuscript discovered at Oxyrhynchus, Egypt and dated approximately to the 2nd century CE. The play is named after its protagonist, Charition, and was likely performed in Egypt. Scholars have suggested that the Greek comedy can be more accurately described as a farce or burlesque rather than a mime.

The play alludes to earlier Greek works, such as Euripides' Iphigenia in Tauris — on which it was perhaps based — and Homer's Odyssey. Charition (Χαριτίων), the protagonist, is a Greek woman held captive at a temple on the west Coast of southern India — similar to Iphigenia, the daughter of Agamemnon — and her brother comes to rescue her. The Greeks eventually escape by getting the Indian king drunk, an element possibly borrowed from the Odyssey.

The text employs a combination of prose and verse forms, being mostly in a "vaguely rhythmical prose" composed largely of iambs. The introduction of humorous elements suggests that the play may have originally been written as a spoof. Its tone and character are almost burlesque, representing a type of drama that, prior to the manuscript’s discovery, was not known to exist in antiquity. The manuscript includes notations likely indicating the use of percussion instruments and possibly the aulos, a Greek double-reeded pipe. This implies that music played a far more significant role in Greek mime than previously believed.

== Plot ==
Charition, a beautiful Greek woman, is captured by (or sold to) the king of a coastal kingdom in India. The king keeps her at the temple of the moon goddess (either as a temple girl or a priestess). A Greek search party —including her brother and a jester — arrives to rescue her after crossing the Indian Ocean.

As Charition, her brother, and the jester discuss their escape, a group of Indian women returning from a hunt encounters them. The jester defends the Greeks with his farts. He also asks Charition to steal items from the moon temple, but she refuses, arguing that robbery would anger the gods.

On the brother's suggestion, the Greeks serve wine to the Indian king and his subjects, intoxicating them. The characters, including the king, then perform a dance for the moon goddess. Eventually, the Greeks discuss tying up the king, who has stumbled—suggested by the loud drums marking the end of the dance.

The ending of the play is lost, but it is implied that the Greeks escape to their ship.

== Indian language dialogues ==
One of the most interesting features of the Charition play is the appearance of a number of characters speaking dialogues in an unknown language. This part was included as amusing gibberish for the contemporary audience, who did not understand it (but may have been aware of the Indian Ocean spice trade). The language may partly or wholly represent an ancient Indian language or dialect, as some words seem to be of Dravidian and Indo-Aryan (Sanskrit) origin.

=== Kannada ===
Shortly after the papyrus' modern publication, German Indologist E. Hultzsch, who had a strong command of the Dravidian languages, proposed that the words represented an ancient form of Kannada, and suggested possible readings for the dialogues in question which made sense in the context in which they were uttered, but couldn't justify their claims and lost it. His findings were criticised by other scholars at the time for being speculative, but even most of Hultzsch's critics accepted that the language must have been a Dravidian language.

Apart from E. Hultzsch, historian B. A. Saletore's explanation of the locale of the story and Shastri's analysis of the language of the play suggest it is a form of Kannada. The subsequent discovery of the Halmidi inscription, which contains a form of Kannada much earlier than the forms known at the time Hultzsch wrote his article, confirms many of his theories on the evolution of the language and might therefore add support to his readings.

=== Tulu ===
According to scholars Shivaprasad Rai (1985) and U. Padmanabha Upadhyaya (1996), the Indian language used in the play is Tulu. Manohar Laxman Varadpande identified the coastal kingdom mentioned in the play with Malpe, which lies in the Tulu Nadu region.

=== Sanskrit and Malayalam ===
T. Z. Mani, writing in the Encyclopedia of Indian Religions, argues that the languages may include Sanskrit and an early form of Malayalam. He tentatively identified 79 Sanskrit words and 25 Malayalam words, in addition to 29 Greek and 12 Aramaic words among the Indian dialogs (which include a total of 146 words). According to scholar George Menachery, Mani's decipherment is much more likely to be accurate than any of the previous assessments.
