= Aulis (ancient Greece) =

Greek port town located in ancient Boeotia

Coordinates: 38°26′00″N 23°35′32″E

Approximate location of ancient Aulis in Greece

Aulis (Ancient Greek: Αὐλίς) was a Greek port town, located in ancient Boeotia in central Greece, at the Euripus Strait, opposite of the island of Euboea, at modern Mikro Vathy/Ag. Nikolaos. Livy states that Aulis was 3 miles (4.8 km) from Chalcis.

Aulis never developed into a fully independent polis, but belonged to ancient Thebes (378 BC) and Tanagra respectively.

According to Homer's epic The Iliad, the Greek fleet gathered in Aulis to set off for Troy. However, the departure for the Trojan War was prevented by Artemis, who stopped the wind to punish Agamemnon, who had killed a deer in a sacred grove and boasted he was the better hunter than she. The fleet was only able to sail off after Agamemnon had sacrificed his eldest daughter, Iphigenia. Strabo says that the harbour of Aulis could only hold fifty ships, and that therefore the Greek fleet must have assembled in the large port in the neighbourhood (Ancient Greek: Βαθὺς λιμὴν, romanized: Bathỳs limḗn, lit. 'deep sea'). Aulis appears to have stood upon a rocky height, since it is called by Homer "rocky Aulis" (Ancient Greek: Αὐλὶς πετρήεσσα, romanized: Aulìs petrḗessa), and by Strabo a "stone village" (Ancient Greek: πετρῶδες χωρίον, romanized: petrôdes chōríon).

In 396 BCE, the Spartan king Agesilaus II, imitating Agamemnon, chose Aulis as the departure point for sailing to Asia with his army. On the eve of sailing Thebans intervened and drove Agesilaus out of Boeotia. This event has been seen as the origin of Agesilaus' personal hatred towards Thebes, which greatly influenced the relationship between Sparta and Thebes over the next 25 years until the decisive Battle of Leuctra.

In the time of Pausanias, Aulis had only a few inhabitants, who were potters. Its temple of Artemis, which Agamemnon is said to have founded, was still standing when Pausanias visited the place.

== See also ==
- Naming citation for Jovian asteroid 6090 Aulis

== External Resources ==
- Description and photos of the archaeological site of ancient Aulis on the Madain Project
