= Thoas (king of the Taurians) =

Greek mythological figure

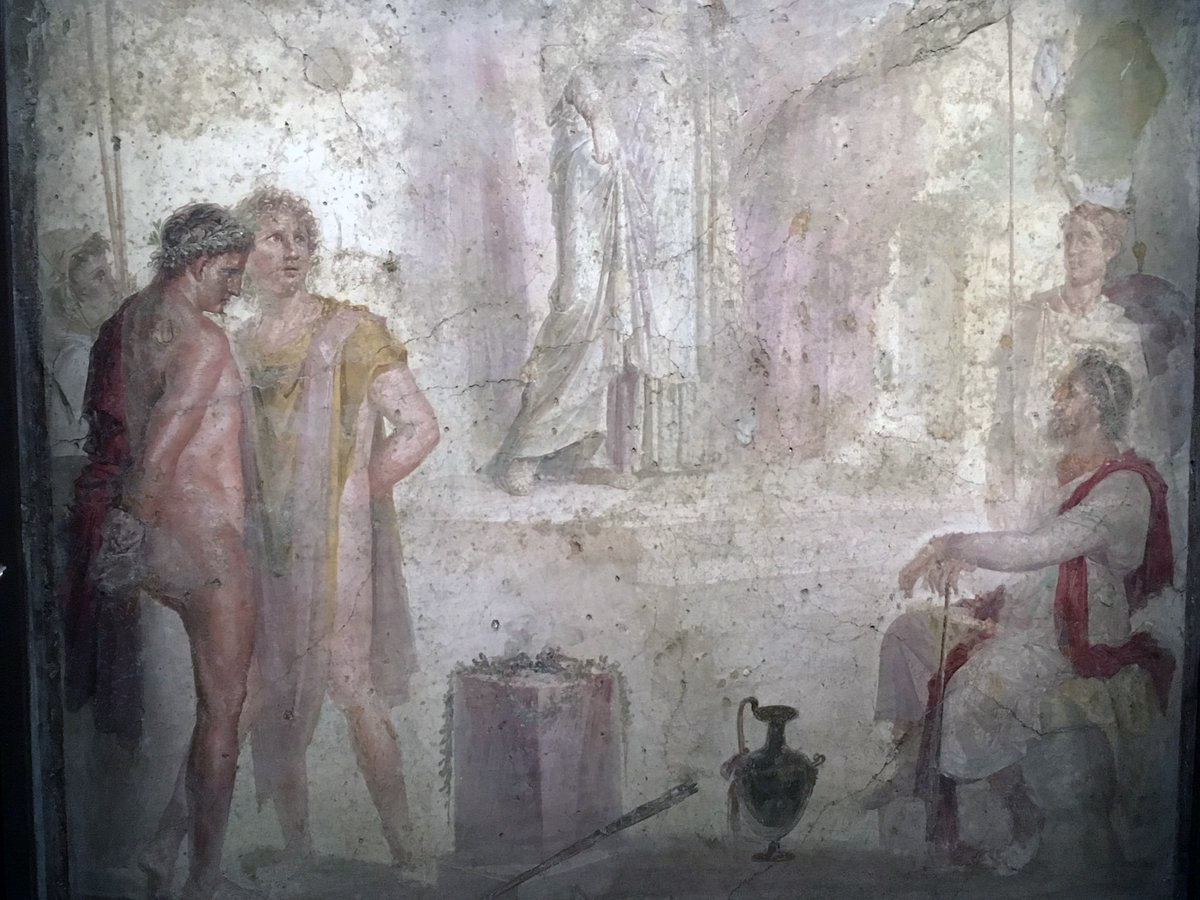
An antique fresco in Pompeii depicting a scene from 'Iphigenia in Tauris' showing Orestes, Pylades and King Thoas

In Greek mythology, Thoas (Ancient Greek: Θόας, lit. 'fleet, swift') was a king of the Taurians, a barbaric tribe in Crimea. He was king when Agamemnon's daughter Iphigenia was taken to the land of the Taurians, and became a priestess of Artemis there. He was a character in Euripides' play Iphigenia among the Taurians. He is sometimes identified with the Thoas who was the king of Lemnos and the son of Dionysus and Ariadne, and the father of Hypsipyle.

According to the Greek grammarian Antoninus Liberalis, the 2nd-century BC poet Nicander said that Thoas was the son of Borysthenes, god of a major river to the far north of Greece (now the Dnieper).

== Euripides ==
In Euripides' play, Iphigenia among the Taurians, Iphigenia, after being rescued from her intended sacrifice at Aulis by Artemis, has been brought to the Taurians and their king Thoas, where she is forced to sacrifice any trespassing Greeks to Artemis.

As the play begins, Iphigenia's brother Orestes arrives, but he is captured and brought before Iphigenia to be sacrificed. But when the siblings discover each other's identity, they discuss ways to escape. Orestes wants to kill Thoas, but Iphigenia suggests that they trick him. Iphigenia meets with Thoas and claims that because of Orestes' sin of matricide he is polluted and needs to be purified by being washed in the sea. Thoas believes her and allows her to take Orestes to the sea, where they make their escape. A messenger relays this to Thoas and he immediately sends his men to pursue them. Athena intervenes and convinces him to let them go.

== Hyginus ==
Hyginus tells much the same story as Euripides, but he identifies the Taurian king Thoas with the Lemnian Thoas who was the father of Hypsipyle. Hyginus provides an ending to Thoas' story, saying that the king pursued Orestes and Iphigenia, to the island home of Chryses, the son of Agamemnon and his Trojan war-prize Chryseis. After Chryses discovered that he was the half brother of Orestes and Iphigenia, he killed Thoas.
