= Strophius =

Set of mythological Greek characters

In Greek mythology, Strophius (/ˈstroʊfiəs/; Ancient Greek: Στρόφιος, romanized: Strophios, lit. 'slippery fellow' or 'twister') was the name of the following personages:

- Strophius, son of Crisus, was a King of Phocis, husband of the sister of Agamemnon (whose name was either Anaxibia, Astyocheia or Cydragora) and, by her, father of Pylades and Astydameia. When Orestes was hiding from his murderous mother, Clytemnestra, Strophius hid him. During this time, Orestes and Pylades became great friends.
- Strophius, one of Pylades' sons with Electra, Orestes' sister. Pylades and Electra's other son was Medon.
- Strophius, father of the Trojan Scamandrius, who was killed by Menelaus.
- Strophius, father of Phlogius, a companion of Dionysus in the Indian campaign.
- Strophius, a man in the crew of Menelaus during his return from Troy.
