= Iphigenia =

Figure from Greek mythology

- Princess of Mycenae
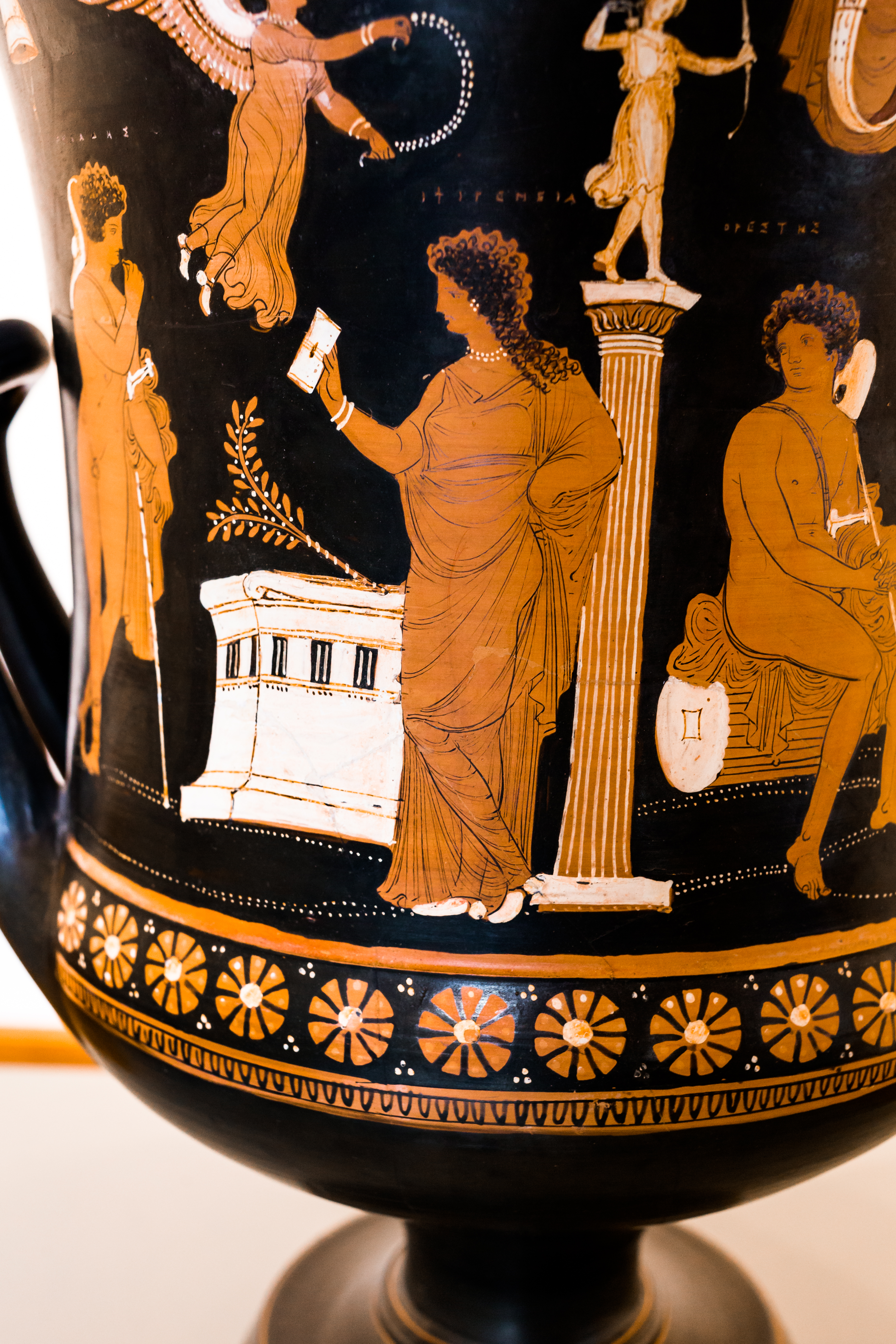
- Iphigenia (centre) stands in a sanctuary of Artemis, in front of a statuette of the goddess (which sits atop a column), and an altar. Near her are Orestes (right), Pylades (far left), and a flying Nike (top left). Apulian red-figure calyx krater, c. 350–340 BC.
- Dynasty: Atreid Dynasty

Genealogy
- Parents: Agamemnon (father); Clytemnestra (mother)
- Siblings: Orestes, Electra, and Chrysothemis

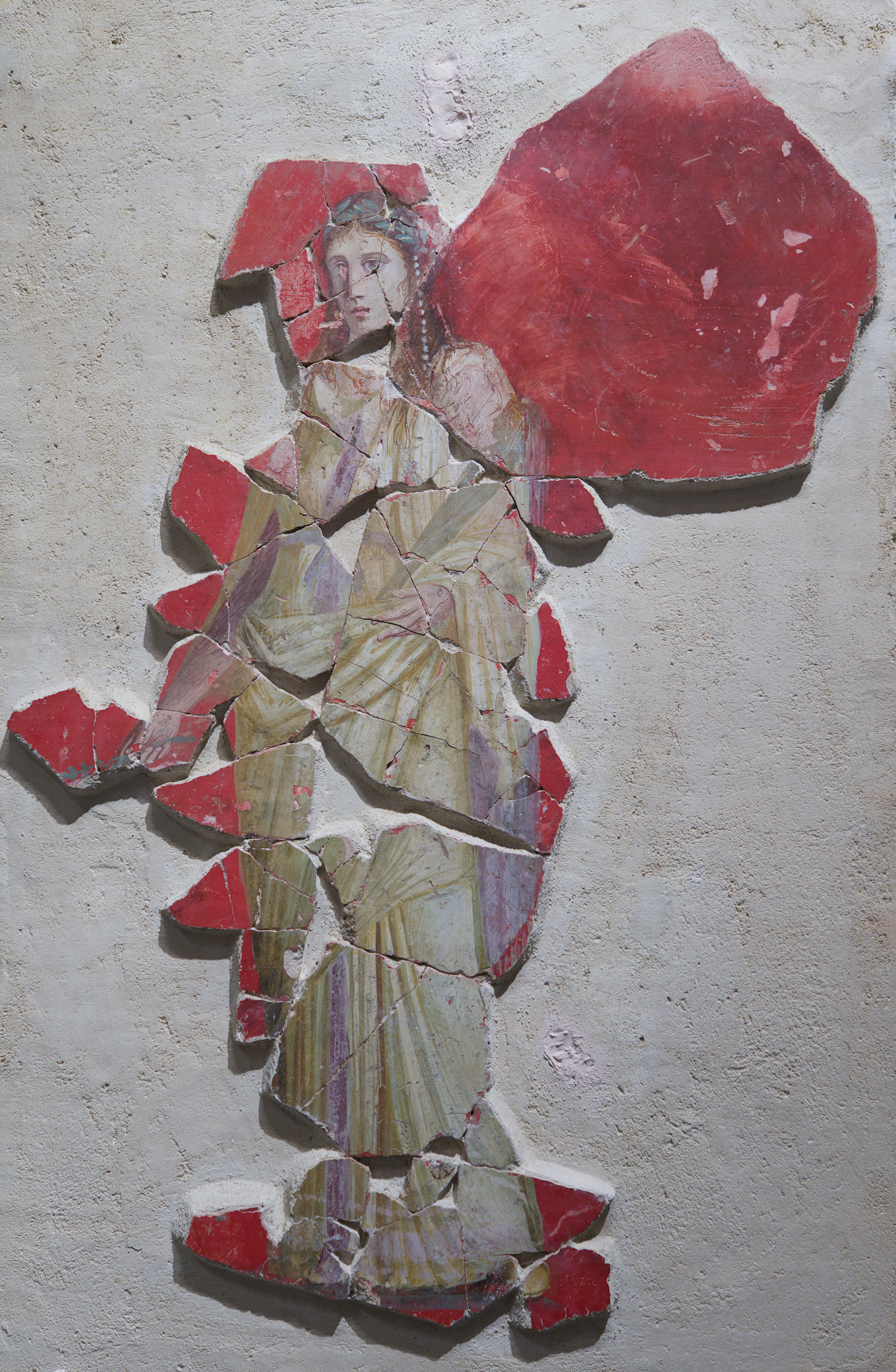
Roman fresco of Iphigenia, from Magdalensberg

In Greek mythology, Iphigenia (/ˌaɪfɪdʒɪˈnaɪə/; /ˌɪfɪdʒɪˈnaɪə/; /ɪˌfɪdʒɪˈnaɪə/; Ancient Greek: Ἰφιγένεια, romanized: Iphigéneia, pronounced [iːpʰiɡéneː.a]) was a daughter of King Agamemnon and Queen Clytemnestra, and thus a princess of Mycenae.

In the story, Agamemnon offends the goddess Artemis on his way to the Trojan War by hunting and killing one of Artemis's sacred stags. She retaliates by preventing the allied troops from reaching Troy unless Agamemnon kills his eldest daughter, Iphigenia, at Aulis as a human sacrifice. In some versions, Iphigenia dies at Aulis, and in others, Artemis rescues her. In the version where she is saved, she is brought to the Taurians and, many years later, meets her brother Orestes there.

== Name ==
"Iphigenia" means "strong-born," "born to strength," or "she who causes the birth of strong offspring."

In Homer's Iliad, Iphianassa (Ἰφιάνασσα) is the name of one of Agamemnon's three daughters (ix.145, 287), a name that may be simply an older variant of the name Iphigenia. "Not all poets took Iphigenia and Iphianassa to be two names for the same heroine," Kerenyi remarks, "though it is certain that to begin with they served indifferently to address the same divine being, who had not belonged from all time to the family of Agamemnon."

The account in the Hesiodic fragmentary epic Catalogue of Women calls the daughter that Agamemnon sacrifices "Iphimede" (Ἰφιμέδη).

== In mythology ==
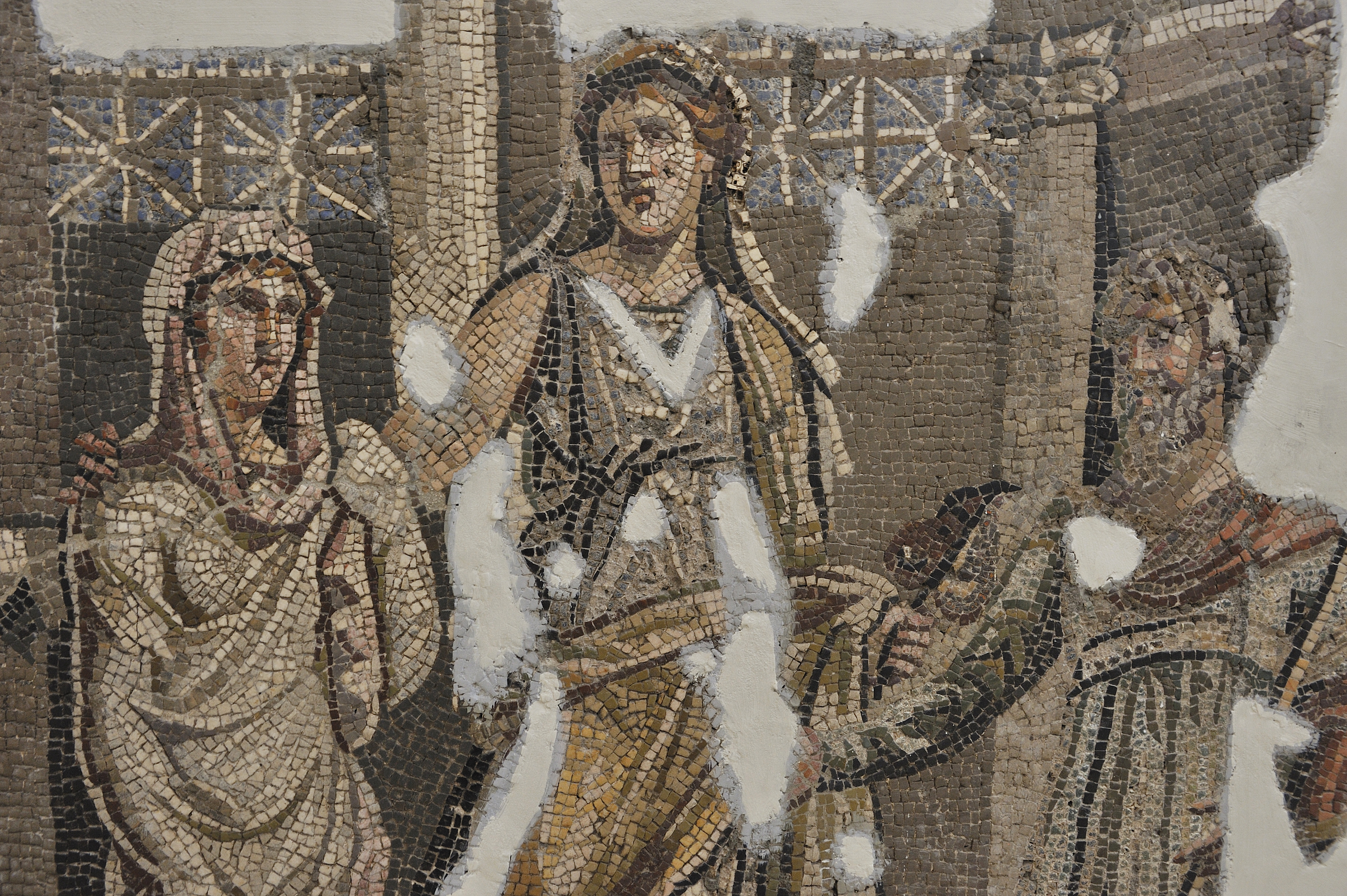
Mosaic, 5th-century CE. From left to right: Iphigenia, Clytemnestra, Agamemnon.

With the potential exception of the Iliad mentioned above, in Greek mythology Iphigenia appears as the Greek fleet gathers in Aulis to prepare for war against Troy. Here, Agamemnon, the leader of the Greeks, hunts and then kills a deer in a grove sacred to the goddess Artemis. Artemis punishes Agamemnon by acting upon the winds, so that Agamemnon's fleet cannot sail to Troy. Calchas the seer tells Agamemnon that to appease Artemis, he must sacrifice his eldest daughter, Iphigenia. At first he refuses but, pressured by the other commanders, is eventually forced to relent.

Iphigenia and her mother Clytemnestra are brought to Aulis, under the pretence that Achilles will marry her. In some versions of the story, they realise the truth, while in others, Iphigenia remains unaware of her imminent sacrifice until the last moment, believing until the moment of her death that she is being led to the altar to be married.

In some versions, such as Hyginus's Fabulae, Iphigenia is not sacrificed. Some sources claim that Iphigenia was taken by Artemis to Tauris (in Crimea) at the moment of the sacrifice, the goddess having left a deer in her stead, or else a goat (actually the god Pan) in her place.

Euripides's description of her sacrifice is as follows:

"...we brought your child to the place where the Greek army had gathered, all together and all at once. When King Agamemnon saw his daughter proceeding to the altar to her death, he heaved a deep sigh and turned his head to one side and wept. He covered his eyes with his robe. But the young girl stood beside her father who had given her life and said: 'Fathers, as you bid me, I am here. I give my body, freely on behalf of my country, for all the land of Greece. Lead me to the altar. There, if that is the gods' will, sacrifice me. May this gift from me bring you success. May you win the crown of victory and win thereafter a glorious homecoming. And no, do not let any man lay his hands upon me. In peace and in good heart I offer you my throat.' So she spoke, and all stood by in wonder at the courage, yes, the virtue of her words. Then Talthybius, for so he was commanded, stood before the assembled army and ordered them to watch and keep holy silence. The Calchas, the prophet, took from its sheath a sharp knife and put it in a basket studded with gold. And upon the young girl's head he put a garland. Achilles, son of Peleus, circled the altar of the goddess, basket in hand, and upon her he sprinkled holy water and he said, 'Artemis, daughter of Zeus, slayer of wild beasts, you that spin the silver light at night, receive this sacrifice which we offer to you. We the Greek army and King Agamemnon offer to you the pure blood that flows from a virgin's throat. Grant our ships an untroubled journey. Grant that our spears will sack the towers of Troy.' The priest seized the knife and offered a prayer as he looked for a place to plunge the knife's point. My soul was deeply troubled and in pain. I stood by, head lowered. Suddenly, it was a miracle: everyone had heard the sound of the knife – but no one could see where in the world the young maiden had disappeared to. The priest cried out. The army echoed his cry, and then they saw the miracle, impossible to believe even as it happened before their eyes. There on the ground lay a deer, gasping for breath. She was a full-grown deer, beautiful, and the altar of the goddess was dripping with her blood. Then Calchas spoke – imagine the joy! – 'Leaders of this the Greek army, do you see this victim that the goddess has laid upon her own altar? This mountain deer? She accepts this offering with greater gladness than the child. For her altar will not now be stained with noble blood. She rejoices in the sacrifice. And she grants us fair sailing and success at Troy. Therefore, courage! To arms, to the ships! For on this day we must leave the hallow bay of Aulis and cross the Aegean Sea.' When the carcass had been reduced to ashes in Hephaestus's fire, Calchas offered a prayer for the safe homecoming of the army. Agamemnon sent me to tell you these things, to tell you of the good fortune he has received from the gods, and of the fame that is now his and will not die, I tell you what I saw. For I was there. There is no doubt your child has been taken to live amongst the gods."

The Hesiodic Catalogue of Women called her Iphimede (Ἰφιμέδη) and told that Artemis made her an immortal companion under the name Artemis Enodia ('Artemis of the Roads)'. Pausanias, centuries later, interpreted this immortal Iphigenia as the goddess Hecate, a goddess connected to both Artemis and crossroads. Antoninus Liberalis said that Iphigenia was transported to the island of Leuke, where she was wedded to immortalized Achilles under the name Orsilochia. In Description of Greece Pausanias mentions several poets claiming Iphigenia to be the daughter of Helen by Theseus, which Clytemnesta raised as her own.

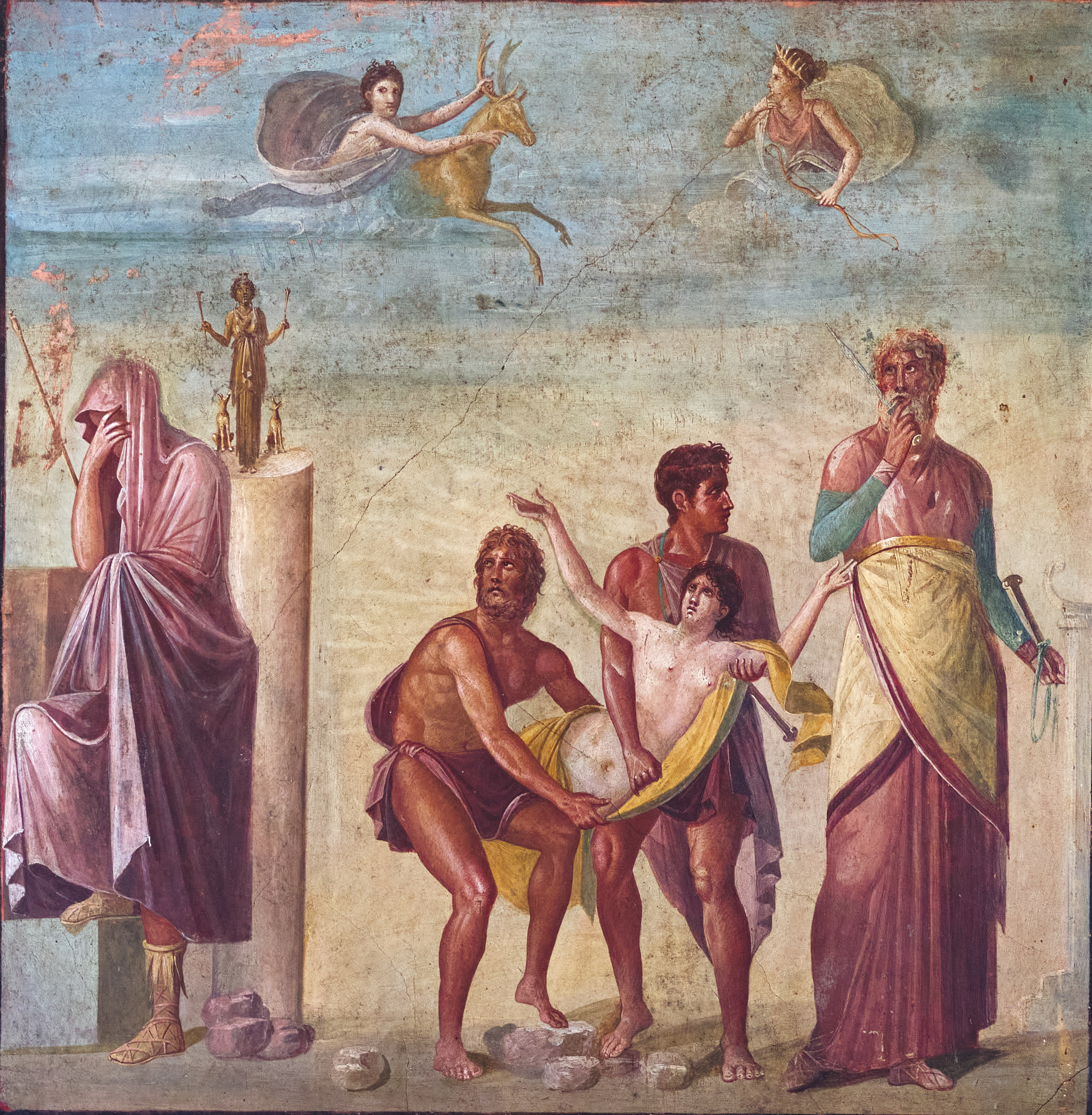
Sacrifice of Iphigenia. Antique fresco from Pompeii, probably a copy of a painting by Timanthes.

In Aeschylus's Agamemnon, the first play in the Oresteia, the sacrifice of Iphigenia is given as one reason for Clytemnestra and her lover Aegisthus to plan to murder Agamemnon.

In Euripides's Iphigenia at Aulis, it is Menelaus who convinces Agamemnon to heed the seer Calchas's advice. After Agamemnon sends a message to Clytemnestra informing her of Iphigenia's supposed marriage, he immediately regrets his decision and tries to send another letter telling them not to come. Menelaus intercepts the letter and he and Agamemnon argue. Menelaus insists that it is Agamemnon's duty to do all he can to aid the Greeks. Clytemnestra arrives at Aulis with Iphigenia and the infant Orestes. Agamemnon tries to convince Clytemnestra to go back to Argos, but Clytemnestra insists on staying for the wedding. When she sees Achilles, Clytemnestra mentions the marriage; Achilles, however, appears to be unaware of it, and she and Iphigenia gradually learn the truth. Achilles, angry that Agamemnon has used him in his plot, vows to help prevent the murder of Iphigenia. Iphigenia and Clytemnestra plead with Agamemnon to spare his daughter's life. Achilles informs them that the Greek army, eager for war, has learned of the seer's advice and now demand that Iphigenia be sacrificed. If Agamemnon refuses, it is likely they will turn on him and kill him and his family. Iphigenia, knowing she is doomed, decides to be sacrificed willingly, reasoning that as a mere mortal, she cannot go against the will of a goddess. She also believes that her death will be heroic, as it is for the good of all Greeks. Iphigenia exits, and the sacrifice takes place offstage. Later, Clytemnestra is told of her daughter's purported death—and how at the last moment, the gods spared Iphigenia and whisked her away, replacing her with a deer.

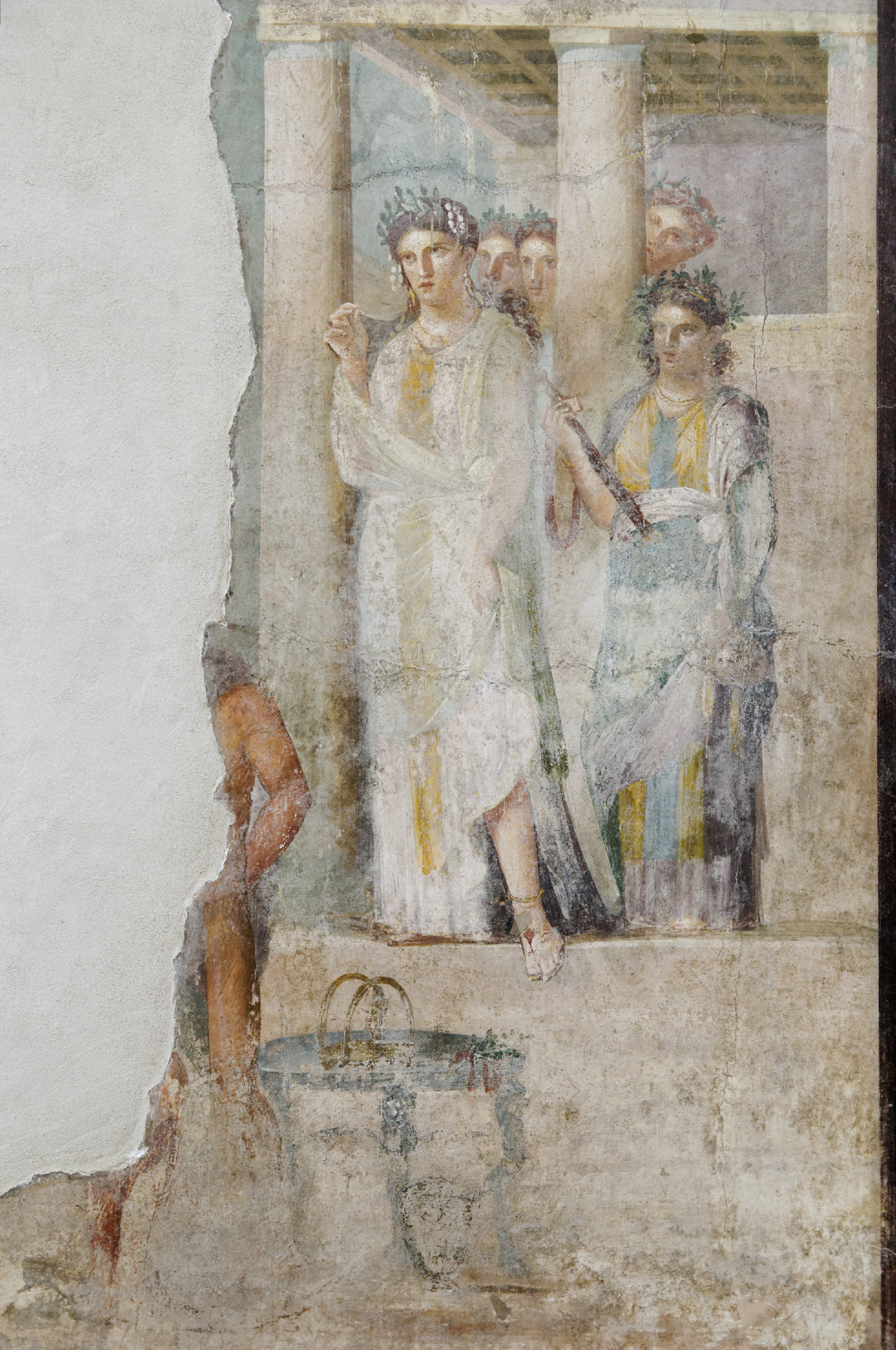
Iphigenia as a priestess of Artemis in Tauris sets out to greet prisoners, amongst which are her brother Orestes and his friend Pylades; a Roman fresco from Pompeii, 1st century AD

Euripides's other play about Iphigenia, Iphigenia in Tauris, takes place after the sacrifice, and after Orestes has killed Clytemnestra and Aegisthus. Apollo orders Orestes—to escape persecution by the Erinyes for killing his mother, Clytemnestra, and her lover—to go to Tauris. While in Tauris, Orestes is to carry off the xoanon (carved wooden cult image) of Artemis, which had fallen from heaven, and bring it to Athens. When Orestes arrives at Tauris with Pylades, son of Strophius and intimate friend of Orestes, the pair are immediately captured by the Tauri, who have a custom of sacrificing all Greek strangers to Artemis. Iphigenia is the priestess of Artemis, and it is her duty to perform the sacrifice. Iphigenia and Orestes don't recognize each other (Iphigenia thinks her brother is dead—a key point). Iphigenia finds out from Orestes, who is still concealing his identity, that Orestes is alive.

Iphigenia then offers to release Orestes if he will carry home a letter from her to Greece. Orestes refuses to go, and bids Pylades to take the letter while Orestes will stay to be slain. After a conflict of mutual affection, Pylades at last yields, and the letter makes brother and sister recognize each other, and all three escape together, carrying with them the image of Artemis. After they return to Greece—having been saved from dangers by Athena along the way—Athena orders Orestes to take the Xoanon to the town of Halae, where he is to build a temple for Artemis Tauropolos. At the annual festival held there, in honor of Artemis, a single drop of blood must be drawn from the throat of a man to commemorate Orestes's near-sacrifice. Athena sends Iphigenia to the sanctuary of Artemis at Brauron where she is to be the priestess until she dies. According to the Spartans, however, they carried the image of Artemis to Laconia, where the goddess was worshipped as Artemis Orthia.

These close identifications of Iphigenia with Artemis encourage some scholars to believe that she was originally a hunting goddess, whose cult was subsumed by the Olympian Artemis.

=== Among the Taurians ===
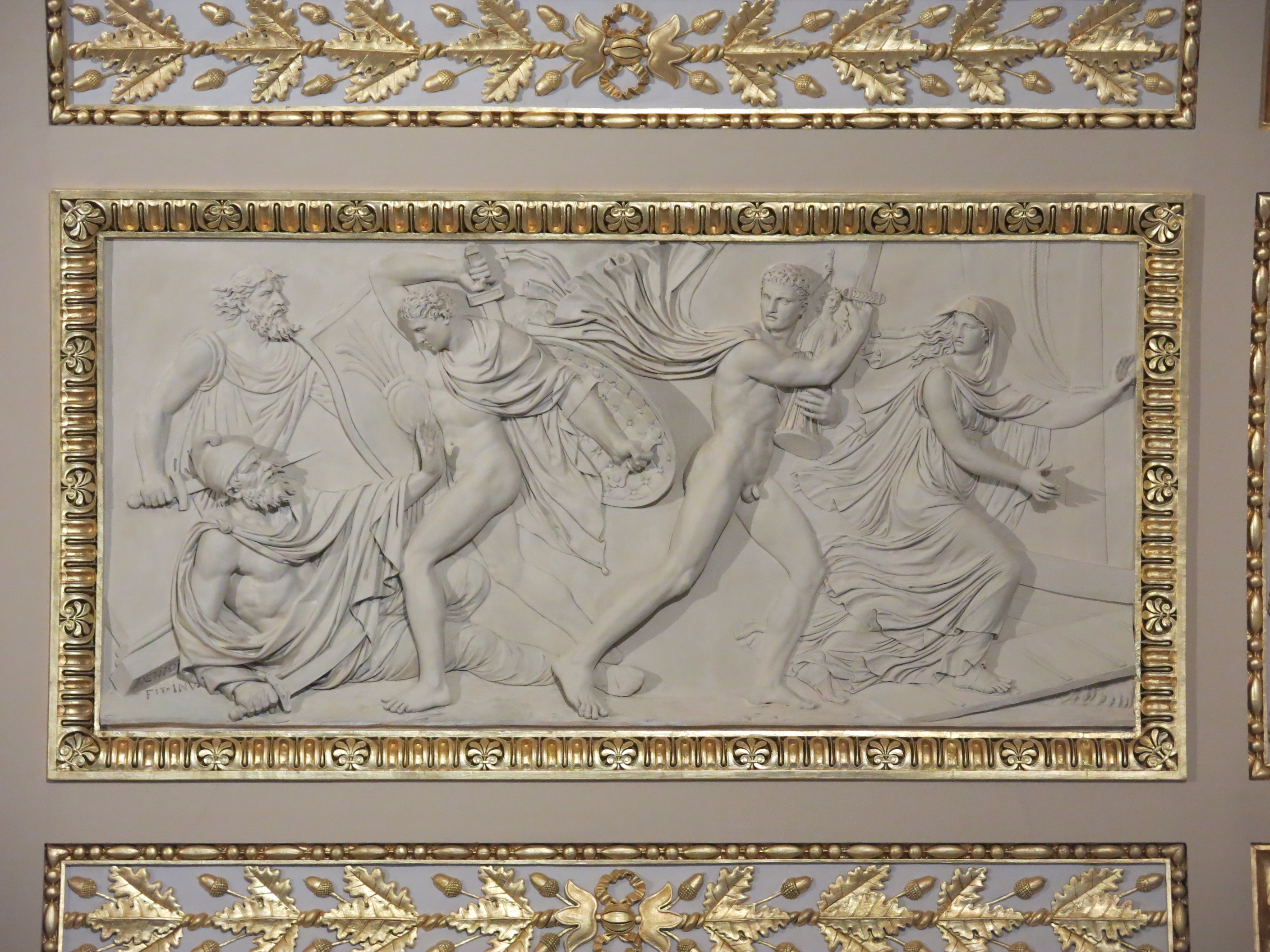
Orestes and Iphigéneia stealing the statue of Diana Tauria

The people of Tauris/Taurica facing the Euxine Sea worshipped the maiden goddess Artemis. Some very early Greek sources in the Epic Cycle affirmed that Artemis rescued Iphigenia from the human sacrifice her father was about to perform, for instance in the lost epic Cypria, which survives in a summary by Proclus: "Artemis ... snatched her away and transported her to the Tauroi, making her immortal, and put a stag in place of the girl [Iphigenia] upon the altar." Hesiod, according to Pausanias, described Iphigenia as not dying but becoming Hecate by the power of Artemis.

The earliest surviving full accounts of the purported death of Iphigenia are in Euripides's Iphigenia at Aulis and Iphigenia in Tauris, Athenian tragedies of the fifth century BC set in the Heroic Age. In the latter drama, the Taurians made Iphigenia a priestess of Artemis at her temple.

=== Among the Etruscans ===
The myth was retold in classical Greece and Italy, and it became most popular in Etruria, especially in Perusia. In the second and first centuries BC the Etruscans adorned their cremation-urns with scenes from the sacrifice. The most common scene: "Iphigenia, a little girl, is held over the altar by Odysseus while Agamemnon performs the aparchai. Clytemnestra stands beside Agamemnon and Achilles beside Odysseus and each one begs for the life of Iphigenia." This version is closest to the myth as the Romans told it.

== Ritual commemorations ==
Many traditions arose from the sacrifice of Iphigenia. One prominent version is credited to the Spartans. Rather than sacrificing virgins, they would whip a male victim in front of a sacred image of Artemis. However, most tributes to Artemis inspired by the sacrifice were more traditional. Taurians especially performed sacrifices of bulls and virgins in honour of Artemis. As part of the cult of Artemis at Brauron, young girls performed a ritual in which they shedded saffron robes and pretended to be she-bears; the sacrifice of Iphigenia is sometimes presented as an origin myth for this practice, through a version of the myth in which, after an unwilling, gagged Iphigenia is seized for sacrifice, she shrugs out of her robes and tries wordlessly to reach out for mercy, leading to her miraculous rescue by Artemis.

== In Homer ==
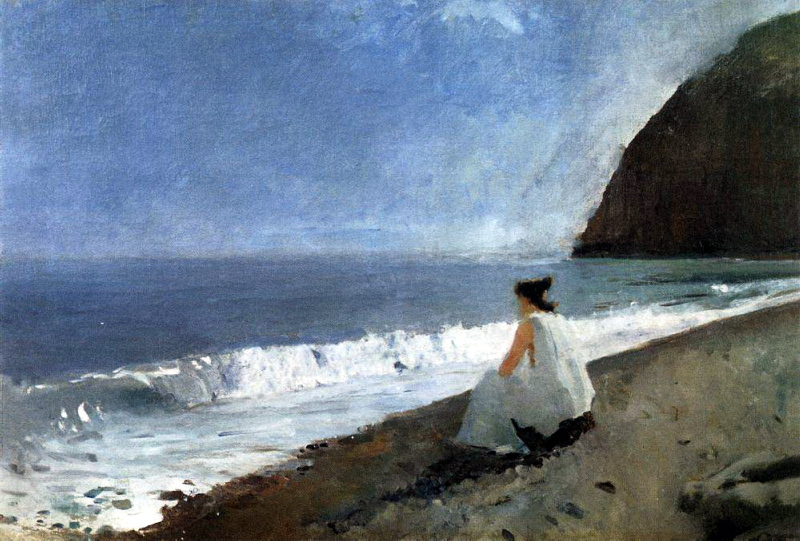
Iphigenia in Tauris (1893) by Valentin Serov

The sacrifice of Iphigenia is not explicitly mentioned by Homer, although scholars argue that it is presupposed by Agamemnon's criticism of Calchas at Iliad 1.105-108; Nelson has developed this suggestion further by arguing that the story of Iphigenia's sacrifice lies allusively behind the opening scenes of the Iliad: "both the debate over Chryseis and her eventual return to her father replay and rework the sacrifice story." He has highlighted six key elements that are shared by each story:

1. Agamemnon offends a deity and is punished.
2. Calchas discloses divine displeasure and proposes a solution: Agamemnon must give up a prized woman from his possession.
3. Achilles loses a potential bride.
4. Odysseus collects and brings this woman to her father by the altar.
5. Sacrifice is performed at the altar.
6. After the sacrifice, the Greeks receive a favorable wind from the offended deity and sail to Troy.

== In Lucretius ==
The sacrifice of Iphigenia appears in the ancient Roman didactic poem De rerum natura by Lucretius as a criticism of religion. Anticipating that his poem will seem sacrilegious, Lucretius attacks the virtue of religion by recounting the story of Iphigenia, which he considers a cruel story of a parent "making his child a sacrificial beast" on her wedding day. Lucretius concludes "such are the crimes to which Religion leads."

== Adaptations ==
=== Ballet ===
- Iphigénie, ballet by Charles le Picq.

=== Films ===
- Iphigenia, 1977 Greek film by Michael Cacoyannis.
- The Killing of a Sacred Deer, 2017 film by Yorgos Lanthimos, which transposes the story to modern America.
- Effi o Blaenau, 2026 Welsh language film by Marc Evans, an adaptation set in modern day Blaenau Ffestiniog, North Wales of the play Iphigenia in Splott.
- The Odyssey, 2026 film by Christopher Nolan.

=== Television series ===
- Helen of Troy, 2003 TV miniseries.
- Troy: Fall of a City, 2018 TV miniseries.

=== Novels ===
- The Songs of the Kings, novel by Barry Unsworth.
- A Memory of Wind, short story by Rachel Swirsky.
- Agamemnon's Daughter, novel by Ismail Kadare.
- A Fair Wind For Troy, a novel by Doris Gates.

=== Opera ===
- Iphigénie en Aulide, opera by Christoph Willibald Gluck.
- Iphigénie en Tauride, opera by Henri Desmarets and André Campra.
- Ifigenia in Tauride, opera by Tommaso Traetta.
- Iphigénie en Tauride, opera by Christoph Willibald Gluck.
- Iphigénie en Tauride, opera by Niccolò Piccinni
- Iphigenia, 2021 opera by Wayne Shorter and Esperanza Spalding.
- Iphigenia's sacrifice, 1968 opera by Pascal Bentoiu.
- Iphigenia in Brooklyn, cantata by PDQ Bach

=== Plays ===
- Iphigenia in Tauris, play by Euripides.
- Iphigenia at Aulis, a play by Euripides.
- Iphigénie en Aulide, play by Jean Racine.
- Iphigenia, play by Mircea Eliade.
- Ifigeneia, rewrite of the play by Finn Iunker
- Iphigenia at Aulis, the first part of The Greeks trilogy, adapted and directed by John Barton for the Royal Shakespeare Company in 1980.
- Iphigenie auf Tauris, play by Johann Wolfgang von Goethe.
- Daughters of Atreus, play by Robert Turney
- Iphigenia, play by Samuel Coster.
- Girl on an Altar, play by Marina Carr.
- Iphigenia in Splott, by Gary Owen, set in modern day Splott, South Wales

=== Poetry ===
- Iphigenia by Ennius
- Metamorphoses, narrative poem by Ovid (books 12 and 13)
- Iphigenia at Aulis, poem by Walter Savage Landor

== See also ==
- Depictions of the Death of Iphigenia
- Jephthah, a similar Biblical story
- Thoas (king of the Taurians)

== Modern sources ==
- Bonnard, A. (1945) Iphigénie à Aulis, Tragique et Poésie, Museum Helveticum, Basel, v.2, pp. 87–107
- Croisille, J-M (1963) Le sacrifice d'Iphigénie dans l'art romain et la littérature latine, Latomus, Brussels, v. 22 pp. 209–25
- Decharme, P. "Iphigenia" In: C. d'Auremberg and E. Saglio, Dictionnaire des Antiquités Grecques et Romaines v.3 (1ère partie), pp. 570–72 (1877–1919)
- Evans, Bergen (1970). Dictionary of Mythology. New York: Dell Publishing. ISBN 0-440-20848-3.
- Graves, Robert (1955) The Greek Myths, Penguin, London, pp. 73–75
- Jouan, F. (1966) "Le Rassemblement d'Aulis et le Sacrifice d'Iphigénie", In: ______, Euripide et les Légendes des Chants Cypriens, Les Belles Lettres, Pris, pp. 73–75
- Kahil, L. (1991) "Le sacrifice d'Iphigénie" in: Mélanges de l'École française de Rome, Antiquité, Rome, v. 103 pp. 183–96
- Kerenyi, Karl (1959) The Heroes of the Greeks, Thames and Hudson, London and New York, pp. 331–36 et passim
- Kjelleberg, L. (1916) "Iphigenia" In: A.F. Pauly and G. Wissowa, Real-Encyclopädie der Classischen Altertumswissenschaft, J.B. Metzler, Stuttgart, v. 9, pp. 2588–622
- Lloyd-Jones, H. (1983) "Artemis and Iphigenia", Journal of Hellenic Studies 103, pp. 87–102
- Nelson, T.J. (2022) ‘Iphigenia in the Iliad and the Architecture of Homeric Allusion’, TAPA 152, 55-101.
- Peck, Harry (1898) "Iphigenia" in Harper's Dictionary of Classical Antiquities, Harper and Brothers, New York
- Séchen, L. (1931) "Le Sacrifice d'Iphigénie", Revue des Études Grecques, Paris, pp. 368–426
- West, M.L. (1985) The Hesiodic Catlogue of Women, The Clarendon Press, Oxford
