= Pylades =

Mythical friend of Orestes

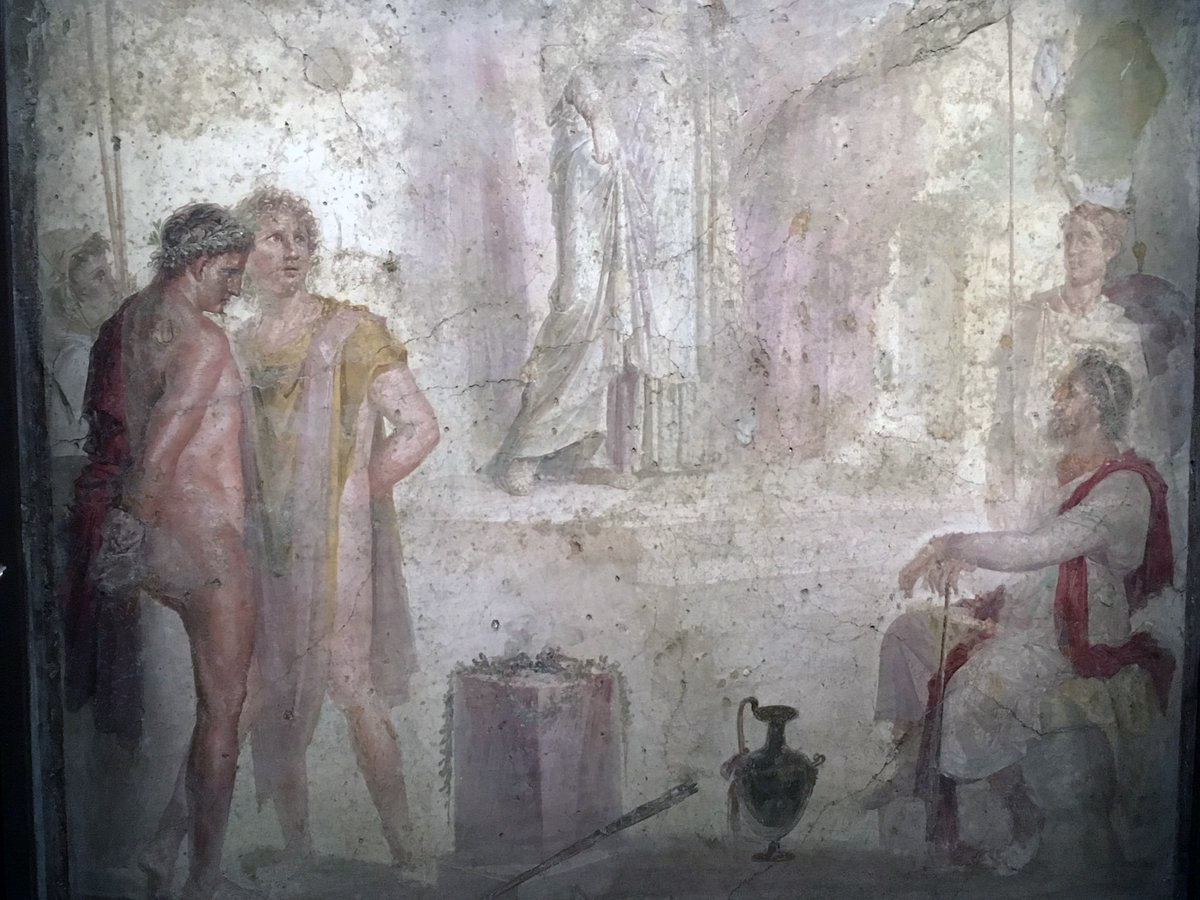
An antique fresco in Pompeii depicting a scene from 'Iphigenia among the Taurians' showing Orestes, Pylades and King Thoas

In Greek mythology, Pylades (/ˈpaɪlədiːz/; Ancient Greek: Πυλάδης, romanized: Pyladēs or Puládēs, lit. 'son of Pylas' or 'the one who is well-treated') was a Phocian prince as the son of King Strophius and Anaxibia, the daughter of Atreus and sister of Agamemnon and Menelaus. He is mostly known for his relationship with his cousin Orestes, son of Agamemnon.

== Mythology ==
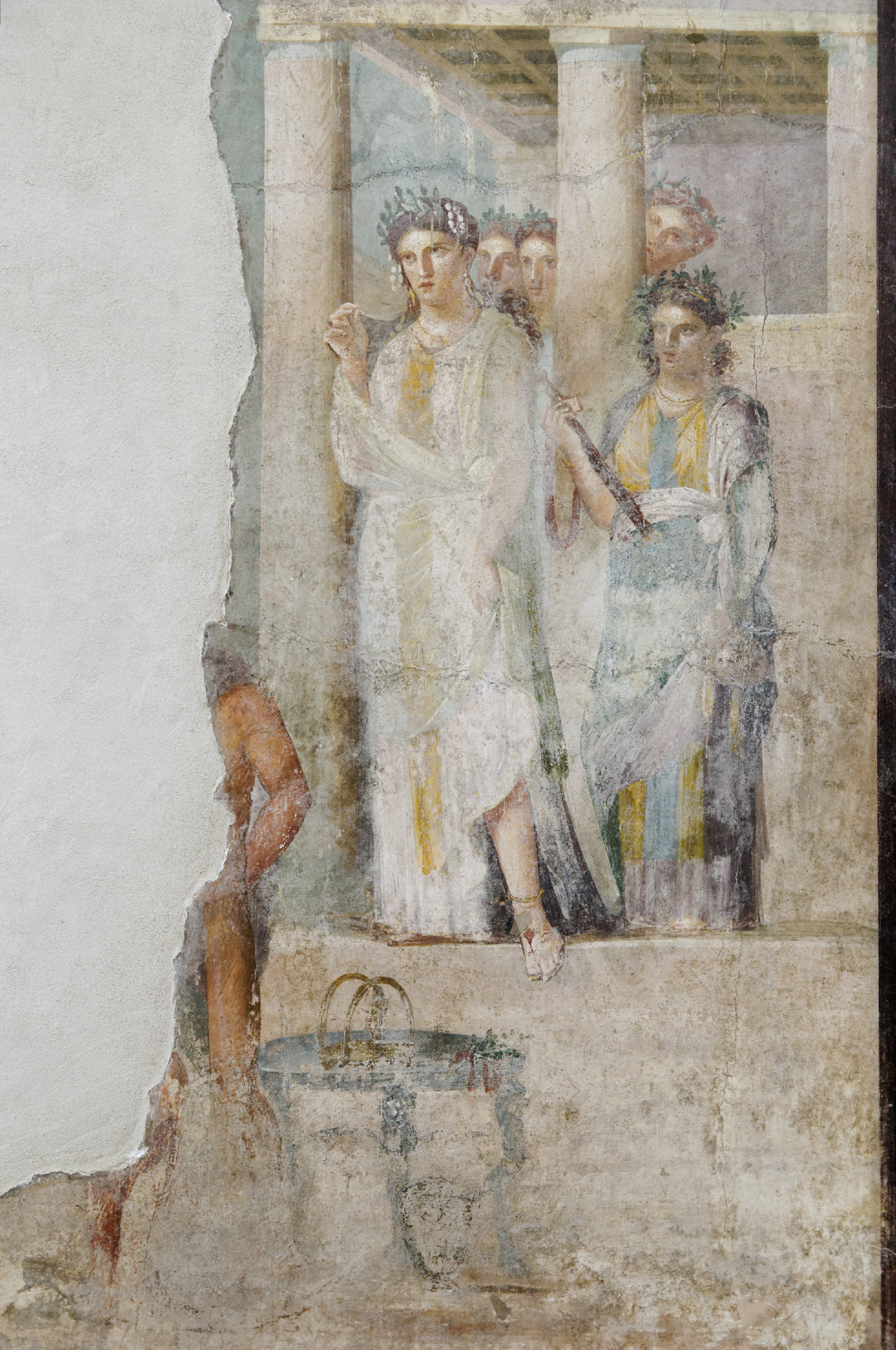
Iphigenia as a priestess of Artemis in Tauris sets out to greet prisoners, amongst which are her brother Orestes and his friend Pylades; a Roman fresco from Pompeii, 1st century AD

=== Family ===
Pylades was the son of Strophius of Phocis and Anaxibia, sister of Agamemnon. He married Electra, the daughter of Agamemnon and sister of Orestes. They had two sons: Strophius, named after Pylades' father, and Medon.

=== Orestes and Pylades ===
Orestes had been sent to Phocis during his mother Clytemnestra's affair with Aegisthus. There he was raised with Pylades, and so considered him to be his closest friend. While Orestes was away, Clytemnestra killed her husband, Orestes' father Agamemnon.

=== Death of Aegisthus and Clytemnestra ===
As an adult, Orestes returns to Mycenae/Argos to avenge the murder of Agamemnon. With the assistance of his friend Pylades, Orestes kills his mother Clytemnestra and her lover Aegisthus. While Pylades seems to be a very minor character in the versions of the story in Classical tragedy, he is arguably the most vital piece of Orestes' plan to avenge his father. In The Libation Bearers, the second play of Aeschylus' trilogy The Oresteia, Pylades speaks only once. His lines come at the moment Orestes begins to falter and second-guess his decision to kill his mother. It is Pylades who convinces Orestes to follow through with his plan for revenge and carry out the murder. The significance of Pylades' lines has invited speculation into whether or not he might represent something more than human next to Orestes; he might play the role of divine encouragement or fate.

In other versions of the revenge of Orestes and Electra (the Electra of Sophocles and the Electra of Euripides), Pylades accompanies Orestes, but does not speak. In Sophocles' version, Orestes pretends to be dead and Pylades carries the urn supposedly holding his friend's remains.

According to Pausanias, Pylades killed two sons of Nauplius (Oeax and Nausimedon) who had come to aid Aegisthus.

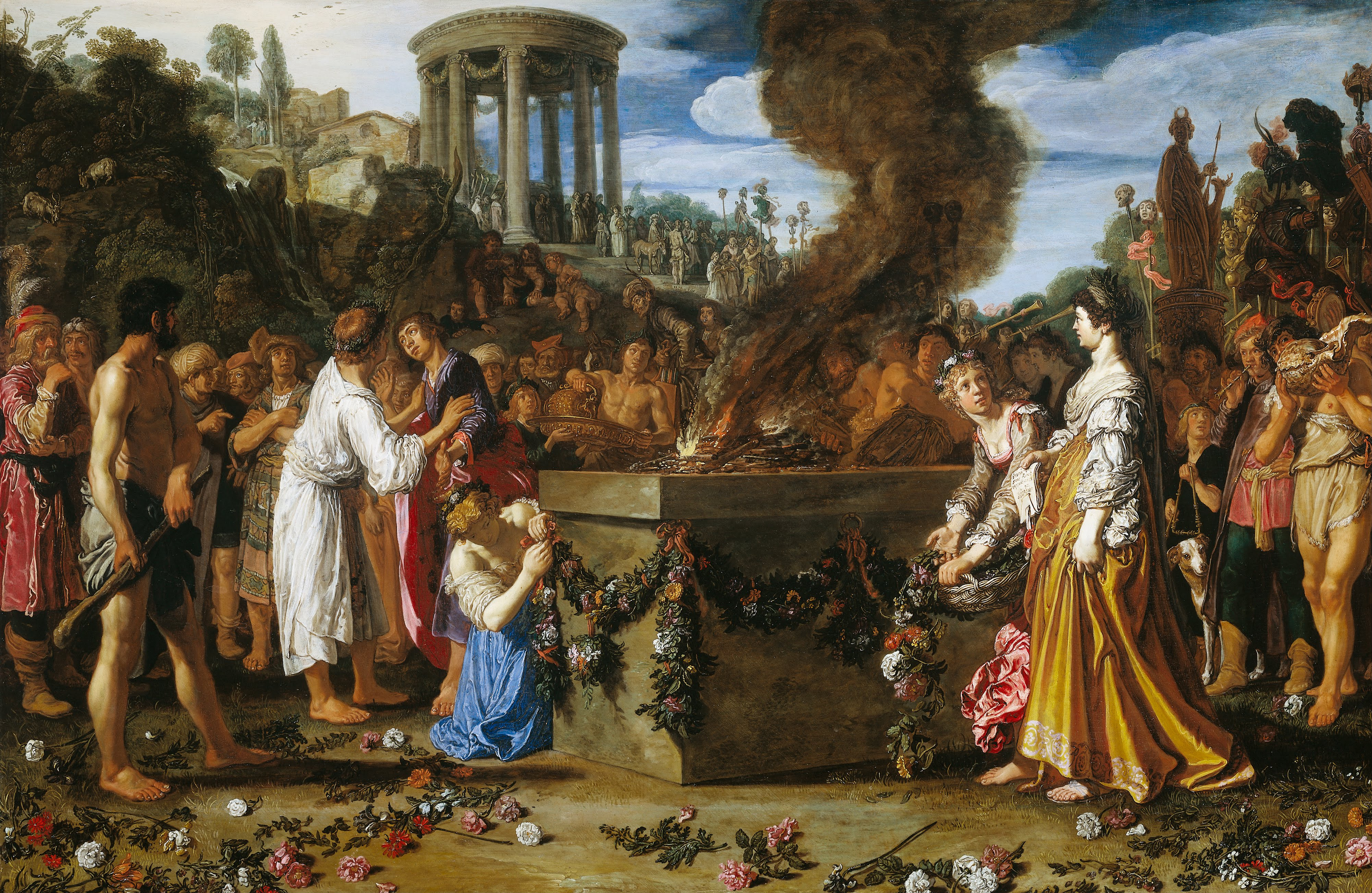
Orestes and Pylades Disputing at the Altar, 1614 Pieter Lastman (1583–1633)

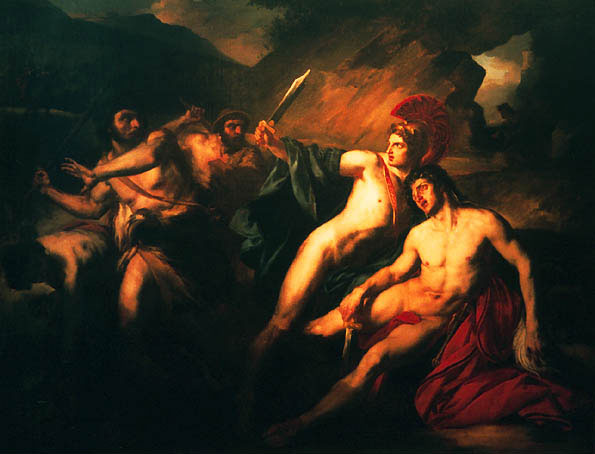
Pylades and Orestes by François Bouchot. Pylades is shown protecting Orestes during his spell of madness.

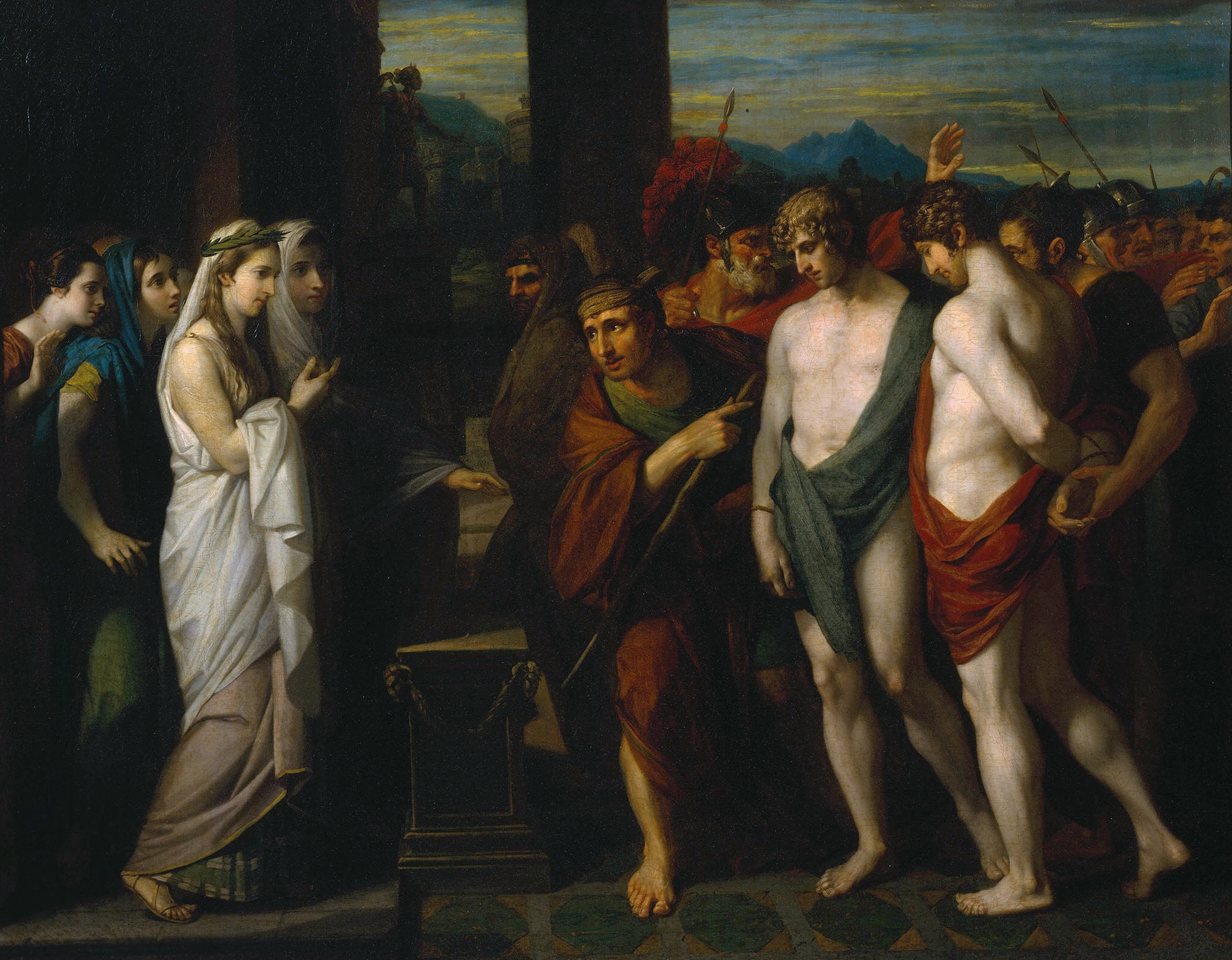
Pylades and Orestes Brought as Victims before Iphigenia, by Benjamin West, 1766

=== Attempted murder of Helen ===
Pylades returns to his homeland, but is exiled by his father for taking part in the crime. He then returns to Orestes' side and helps him to come up with a plan to avoid execution. They attempt to murder Helen, wife of Orestes' uncle Menelaus, after he proves to be of no help in protecting Orestes. However, their attempt fails through the intervention of the gods. They then take hostage Hermione, daughter of Helen and Menelaus. Apollo arrives to settle the situation and gives them all instructions, including one for Pylades to marry Orestes' sister Electra. Many of these events are depicted in Euripides' play Orestes.

=== Tauris ===
Pylades plays a major role in another of Euripides' plays, Iphigeneia in Tauris. In order to escape the persecutions of the Erinyes, Orestes is ordered by Apollo to go to Tauris, carry off the statue of Artemis, which had fallen from heaven, and bring it to Athens. He goes to Tauris with Pylades and the pair are at once imprisoned by the people, among whom the custom is to sacrifice all strangers to Artemis. Orestes is seized by a mania for fear of the barbarians; Pylades tends to him, acting, as described in Lucian's Amores "not only like a lover but like a father." The priestess of Artemis, whose duty it is to perform the sacrifice, is Orestes' sister Iphigeneia. She offers to release Orestes if he carries home a letter from her to Greece; he refuses to go, but bids Pylades take the letter while he himself stays to be slain. Pylades eventually agrees, but the letter causes Orestes to recognise Iphigenia and reveal himself. The three escape together, carrying with them the image of Artemis.

== Pylades and Orestes ==
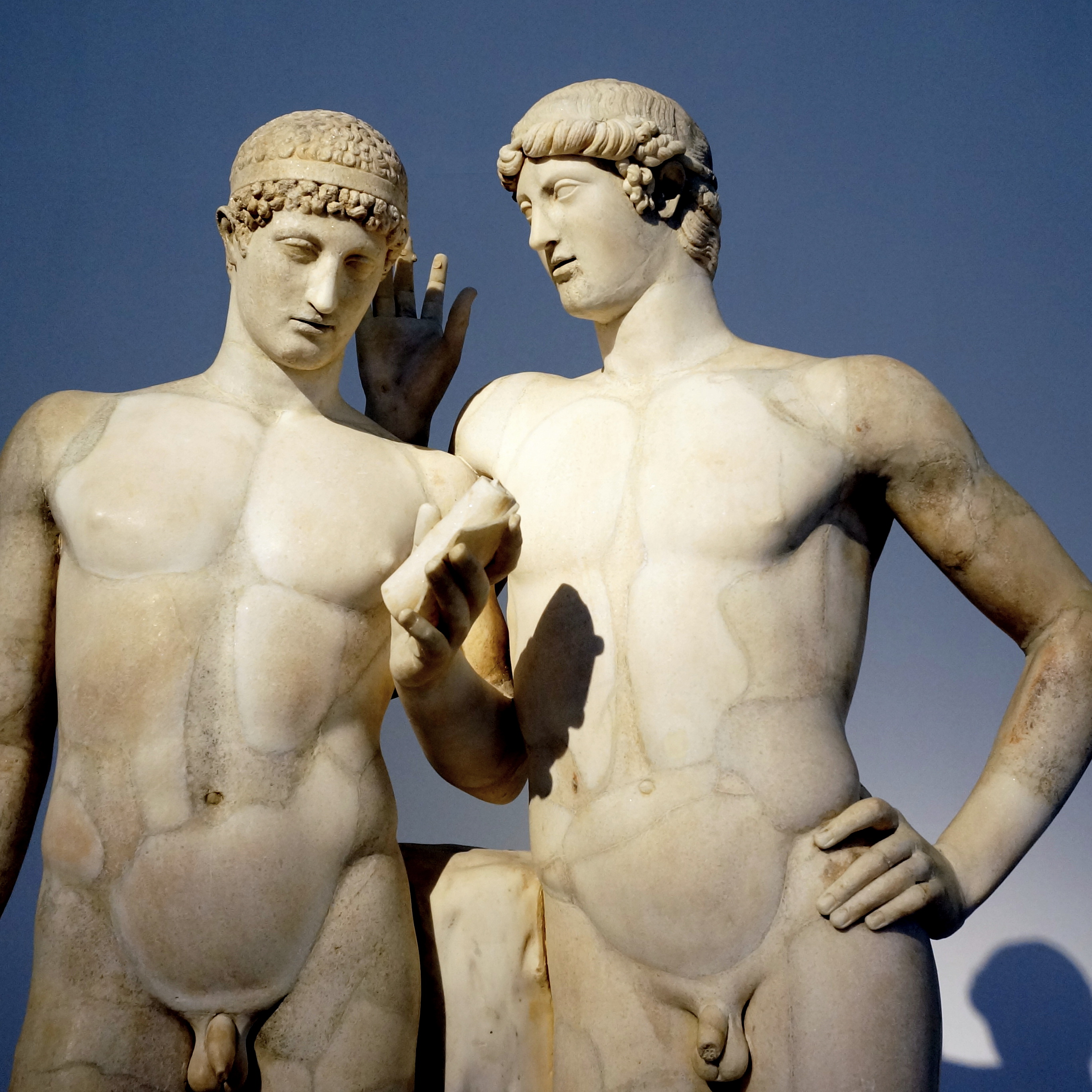
Orestes and Pylades (1st century)

The relationship between Orestes and Pylades has been presented by some authors of the Roman era as romantic. The dialogue Erotes ("Affairs of the Heart"), attributed to Lucian, compares the merits and advantages of heterosexuality and homosexuality, and Orestes and Pylades are presented as the principal representatives of a loving relationship:

"Phocis preserves from early times the memory between Orestes and Pylades, who taking a god as witness of the passion between them, sailed through life together as though in one boat. Both together put to death Klytemnestra, as though both were sons of Agamemnon; and Aegisthus was slain by both. Pylades suffered more than his friend by the punishment which pursued Orestes. He stood by him when condemned, nor did they limit their tender partnership to the bounds of Greece, but sailed to the farthest boundaries of the Scythians – the one sick, the other ministering to him. When they had come into the Tauric land, straightaway they were met by the matricidal fury; and while the inhabitants were standing round in a circle, Orestes fell down and lay on the ground, seized by his usual condition, while Pylades 'wiped away the foam, tended his body, and covered him with his well-woven cloak' – acting not only like a brother but like a father too. When it was determined that one should remain to be put to death, and the other should go to Mycenae to convey a letter, each wishes to remain for the sake of the other, thinking that if he saves the life of his friend, he saves his own life. Orestes refuses to take the letter, saying that Pylades was more worthy to carry it, acting more like the older lover than the younger. 'For,' he said, 'the slaying of this man would be a great grief to me, as I am the cause of these misfortunes.' And he added, 'Give the tablet to him, for (turning to Pylades) I will send thee to Argos, in order that it may be well with thee; as for me, let anyone kill me who desires it.' Such love is always like that; for when from boyhood a serious love has grown up and it becomes adult at the age of reason, the long-loved object returns reciprocal affection, and it is hard to determine which the lover of which, for – as from a mirror – the affection of the lover is reflected from the beloved." (47, W. J. Baylis)

In 1734, George Frederic Handel's opera Oreste (based on Giangualberto Barlocci's Roman libretto of 1723), was premiered in London's Covent Garden. The fame of Lucian's works in the 18th century, as well as the generally well-known tradition of Greco-Roman heroic homoeroticism, made it natural for theatre audiences of that period to have recognized an intense, romantic, if not positively homoerotic quality, to the relationship between Orestes and Pylades.

== Other Pylades in history ==
After the assassination of Roman Emperor Pertinax by the Pretorian Guard and the auctioning of the Emperorship, the new emperor, Didius Julianus, celebrated as follows: "A magnificent feast was prepared by his order, and he amused himself till a very late hour, with dice, and the performances of Pylades, a celebrated dancer."
