= Chrysothemis =

Name of multiple figures in Greek mythology

In Greek mythology, Chrysothemis or Khrysothemis (/krɪˈsɒθɪmɪs/; Ancient Greek: Χρυσόθεμις, romanized: Chrysóthemis, lit. 'golden law' or 'golden custom / justice') is a name ascribed to several female characters in Greek mythology.

- Chrysothemis, daughter of Carmanor and the first winner of the oldest contest held at the Pythian Games, the singing of a hymn to Apollo. She was the wife of Staphylus or a lover of Apollo.
- Chrysothemis, a Hesperid pictured and named on an ancient vase together with Asterope, Hygieia and Lipara.
- Chrysothemis, daughter of Danaus. She married (and killed) Asterides, son of Aegyptus.
- Chrysothemis, daughter of Agamemnon and Clytemnestra. Unlike her sister, Electra, Chrysothemis did not protest or enact vengeance against their mother for having an affair with Aegisthus and then killing their father. She appears in Sophocles's Electra.
