= Clytemnestra (novel) =

2023 novel by Constanza Casati

- Author: Costanza Casati
- Language: English
- Genre: Fantasy; myth
- Published: 2 March 2023
- Publisher: Penguin Michael Joseph
- Pages: 448
- ISBN: 9781728268231

Clytemnestra is a 2023 novel, the debut novel by Italian author Costanza Casati. It is a feminist retelling of the story of Clytemnestra, a character from Greek mythology. The original Clytemnestra has been maligned for her betrayal and murder of her husband Agamemnon. Casati's novel tells Clytemnestra's story from her own perspective.

== Plot ==
Clytemnestra and her sister Helen grow up in Sparta, daughters of King Tyndareus and his wife Leda. Helen is clever but physically weaker; Clytemnestra defends her from other girls. In particular, the girls quarrel with their age-mate Cynisca. Rumors about Helen's parentage make her childhood difficult; some say that she was conceived after Zeus raped her mother Leda, while others state that she is a mortal bastard.

Clytemnestra's twin brothers Castor and Polydeuces plan to leave Sparta to join Jason and the Argonauts. Clytemnestra weds Tantalus and soon becomes pregnant. Tantalus returns to his kingdom temporarily, leaving Clytemnestra with her parents.

Meanwhile, political turmoil erupts in the nearby city-state of Mycenae. King Atreus is murdered by his nephew Aegisthus. The sons of Atreus, Agamemnon and Menelaus, flee their city and seek refuge in Sparta. Agamemnon is respected by the Spartan men but abuses the female servants. Tyndareus refuses to send them away. Eventually, the brothers reclaim their throne, and Aegisthus is exiled.

Tyndareus declares that he will hold a contest for Helen's hand in marriage. He forces all potential suitors to swear an oath to support Helen's eventual husband. Helen chooses to marry Menelaus.

Clytemnestra goes into labor and gives birth to a healthy son. Assisted by Clytemnestra's rival Cynisca, Agamemnon kills Tantalus as well as the baby. Tyndareus was aware of this murderous scheme; he approved it in order to strengthen the alliance between Sparta and Mycenae. Clytemnestra is forced to marry Agamemnon.

Fifteen years later, Clytemnestra and Agamemnon have children, including Iphigenia, Orestes, and Elektra. She returns to Sparta for her father's funeral. There, she kills Cynisca. She learns that Helen is hosting Paris, a prince of Troy. Helen confesses to her sister that she and Paris have begun an affair. Castor is killed in a dispute involving women. On the day she learns of her brother's death, Clytemnestra also learns that Helen has left Menelaus for Paris.

Drawing on their oath, Agamemnon and Menelaus raise an army from among Helen's former suitors. Clytemnestra and her daughter Iphigenia are summoned to Aulis. Agamemnon claims that he has arranged a marriage between Iphigenia and Achilles. At Aulis, the Greek ships are trapped by a lack of wind. On the orders of the seer Calchas, Agamemnon sacrifices his own daughter to win the favor of Artemis and allow the ships to sail.

Nine years later, the Trojan War still rages, and an embittered Clytemnestra rules in her husband's absence. Agamemnon's cousin Aegisthus returns from exile and seeks shelter with Clytemnestra. Clytemnestra and Aegisthus begin an affair, which scandalizes Mycenae. Clytemnestra executes two city elders who oppose her affair.

Clytemnestra and Aegisthus plan to murder Agamemnon upon his imminent return to Mycenae. She sends her son Orestes to Sparta, fearing that he will be honor-bound to avenge his father's death. Agamemnon returns to the city with Cassandra, a Trojan princess that he has taken as a slave.

Clytemnestra kills Calchas in revenge for her daughter's sacrifice. She then confronts Agamemnon and kills him in his own bath. A horrified Elektra finds her father's corpse. Meanwhile, Aegisthus kills Cassandra; he assumes that Clytemnestra wants her husband's new concubine dead. Clytemnestra finds Cassandra's body and weeps.

Clytemnestra consolidates power in Mycenae. Elektra vows revenge against her mother.

== Major themes ==
Valerie Safronova of The Parliament Magazine wrote that the character of Clytemnestra is part of a tradition of Greek tales regarding vengeance. Casati reimagines the ways in which men and women are treated in the original texts. When Theseus is not punished for raping Helen, the author shows "the celebrated men of Greek myths were selfish, violent brutes who took whatever they wanted with no regard to the desires of others or the consequences." This is further exemplified when Iphigenia's death is condoned by Greek men, but Clytemnsetra is portrayed as villainous for killing Agamemnon.

Siobhan Ball of The Mary Sue commented further on this theme, criticizing the original portrayal of Clytemnestra as a villain and noting that even later Greek authors "had to find ways to further villainize her ... to ensure the audience would go along with the play and see her death as a desirable outcome." Ball then stated that "Above all else, Clytemnestra is a story about systemic cruelty and kyriarchal oppression, and how the effects of those systems are inescapable for the individuals navigating them." Ball recounts multiple instances within the story in which men sacrifice the women in their lives for power, then describes the way in which Clytemnestra hardens herself ... reducing the people she cared about to tools to ensure her victory."

== Reception and awards ==
Lacy Baugher Milas of Paste praised Casati's decision to focus on Clytemnestra's origins and upbringing. The author spends less than a quarter of the novel on Iphigenia's sacrifice and Clytemnestra's search for revenge, allowing "the essential plot beats of a story we all know the ending to feel fresh and new." Milas also praised the author's decision to end the novel prior to the aftermath of Agamemnon's murder, stating that it ends "on a moment of triumph we all know to be false—but one that, in its way, feels like a welcome relief." Siobhan Ball concluded that "There are no heroes in this novel, no unambiguously good people... and yet within that there are still characters we can empathize with, damaged people we want to see win, to survive and thrive despite it, and that’s a credit to Casati’s storytelling."

Fabienne Schwizer of Grimdark Magazine compared the novel to other modern retellings, including Elektra by Jennifer Saint and The Daughters of Sparta by Claire Heywood. Schwizer noted that Clytemnestra is the most character-driven of the three novels, praising Casati's work as "a well-rounded, tense and perfectly paced story". Kate Braithwaite of the Historical Novel Society compared the novel to works by Madeline Miller and Natalie Haynes. This review called the novel "an outstanding portrait in humanity, motherhood, sisterhood, grief, loss and revenge." Publishers Weekly called the book an "impressive debut". The review praised Casati's ability to make "this grim tale feel fresh through vivid imagery and nuance characterizations," despite a plot that would likely be well known to the reader.
