= Iphianassa (daughter of Agamemnon) =

Greek mythological figure

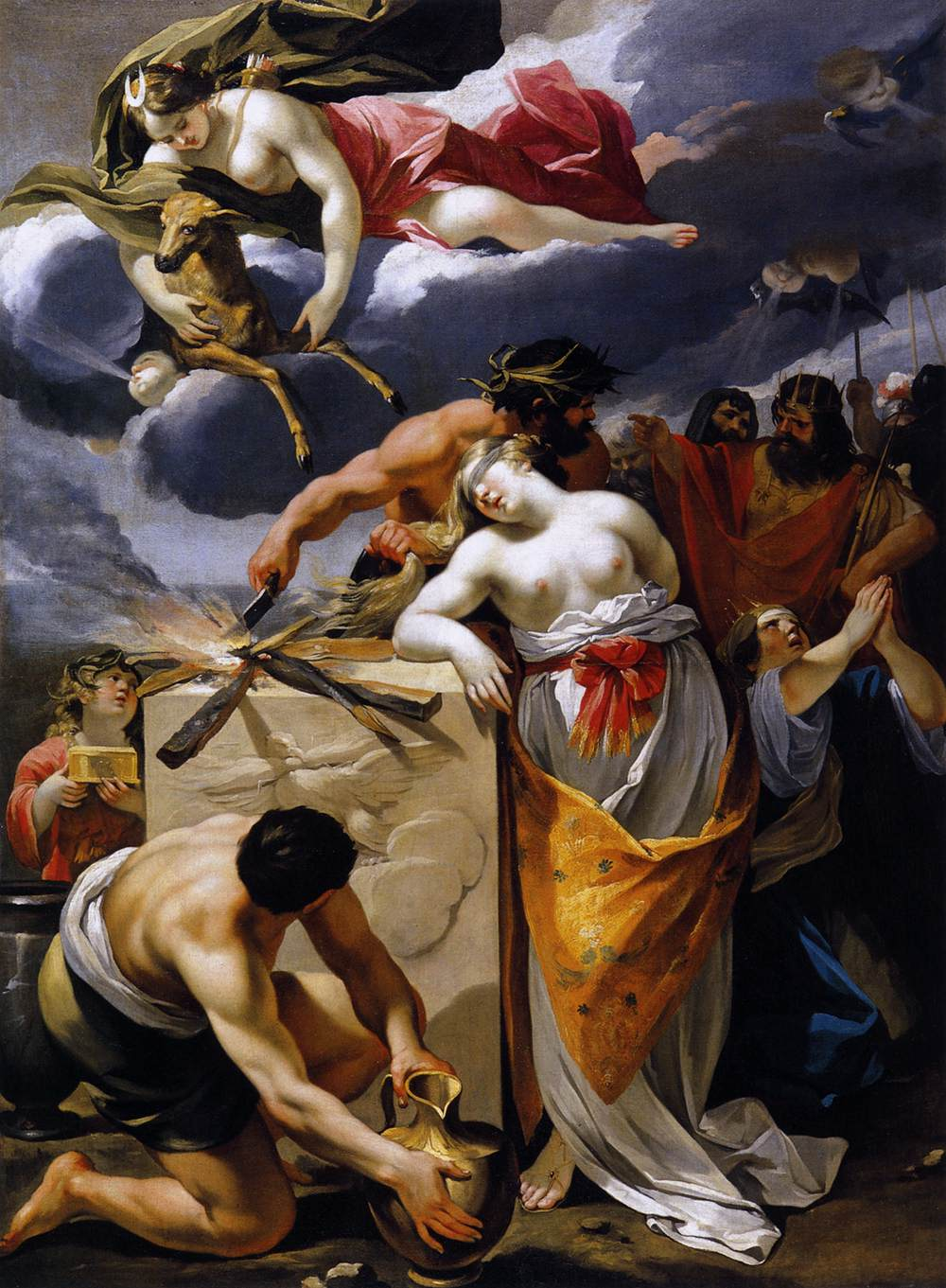
Painting depicting the sacrifice of Iphigenia

In the Iliad, Iphianassa (/ˌɪfiəˈnæsə/; Ancient Greek: Ἰφιάνασσα, romanized: Iphiánassa, lit. 'strong queen') is an obscure and controversial daughter of Agamemnon and Clytaemnestra, sister to Laodice and Chrysothemis, sometimes considered identical to Iphigenia.

== Mythology ==
Iphianassa is mentioned in Book 9 of the Iliad, although unlike later descriptions of Iphigenia she is implied to be living; when Agamemnon attempts to entice Achilles back into his army with promises of riches and women, he includes arranging the marriage of Achilles to one of his three daughters.

Extant plays by Aeschylus and Euripides on the tale of Orestes and Electra do not include her as a character. This is consistent with the theory that she and Iphigenia are one and the same. On the other hand, Sophocles does mention her, and hints that she lives in the palace of Aegisthus and Clytemnestra, together with Electra and Chrysothemis.

Lucretius, in De Rerum Natura, mentions Iphianassa being sacrificed by her father on the altar of the "Virgin of the Crossways" (Triviai virginis) Diana at Aulis as an offering to ensure a successful voyage, in undoubted reference to the tradition of Iphigenia. Lucretius cited this episode to make the point: "Superstition (religio) was able to induce so great an evil."
