= Erigone (daughter of Aegisthus) =

Greek mythological princess

In Greek mythology, Erigone (/ɪˈrɪɡəni/; Ancient Greek: Ἠριγόνη, romanized: Ērigónē, lit. 'early-born') is the daughter of Aegisthus and Clytemnestra, rulers of Mycenae after the murder of King Agamemnon. Depending on version she was either married to her half-brother Orestes and bore him children, or Orestes tried to kill her when he claimed his throne, but the goddess Artemis saved her.

== Family ==
As the daughter of Clytemnestra and Aegisthus, Erigone was the full-sister of Helen and Aletes, and half-sister to Orestes, Electra, Iphigenia and Chrysothemis.

== Mythology ==
Orestes, her older half-brother, avenged the murder of his father Agamemnon by slaying Erigone's parents, Aegisthus and Clytemnestra, but Erigone took him to trial for their deaths. After that Orestes was hunted by the Erinyes for his crime, and left for Taurica where he chanced upon his sister Iphigenia, alive and well. During that time, Erigone's full-brother Aletes seized the throne after a false message conveyed that Orestes had died. Orestes returned nevertheless along with Iphigenia, and slew Aletes; he would have killed Erigone as well had Artemis not intervened and taken the girl away to be her priestess.

In other traditions however Erigone bore Orestes children (either within wedlock or illegitimate ones): Tisamenus (usually the son of Hermione), and Penthilus.

== In Culture ==
Ancient sources mention several tragedies entitled Erigone, attributed to Sophocles, Philocles, Cleophon, Phrynichus, Lucius Accius, and Quintus Tullius Cicero. The texts of all these works have been completely lost, and it remains unclear which plays were devoted to the daughter of Aegisthus and which to the daughter of Icarius. The version of the myth presented in the Fabulae of Pseudo-Hyginus may represent a retelling of a tragedy by Lycophron. An ancient sarcophagus has survived depicting Erigone assisting her father in battle against Orestes.

An asteroid, (163) Erigone, discovered in 1876 by Henri-Joseph Perrotin, was named in honor of one of the two mythological figures bearing the name.
