= Aletes of Mycenae =

Greek mythological character

In Greek mythology, Aletes (Ancient Greek: Ἀλήτης, romanized: Alētēs, lit. 'wanderer', 'roamer' or 'traveler') was the son of Aegisthus and Clytemnestra, the king and queen of Mycenae. He had two full sisters: Erigone and Helen, as well 4 maternal half-siblings: Clytemnestra's first child, Orestes, Electra, Iphigenia and Chrysotemis.

== Mythology ==
When Aletes and his siblings were young, their parents were killed by Orestes, who was their half-brother and the son of Clytemnestra and Agamemnon (this was in revenge for Clytemnestra killing Agamemnon, which she claimed was in revenge for Agamemnon killing their daughter Iphigenia). The infant Helen was also killed.

In most accounts, Orestes leaves Mycenae after he kills his mother and is pursued by the Furies. He wanders, is purified, and eventually marries his cousin Hermione, who lives in Sparta (he is also said to have traveled to Crimea to visit Iphigenia, who in some stories miraculously survived her father's attempt to sacrifice her to Artemis).

Meanwhile, Aletes has come of age, and he assumes the throne at Mycenae. Orestes returns with troops, kills Aletes, and takes the throne. Orestes is said to have a son, Penthilus, with his half-sister Erigone, though stories differ as to whether this was by rape or if they married. Some say Erigone hanged herself.
