= Clytemnestra =

Figure from Greek mythology

- Queen of Mycenae
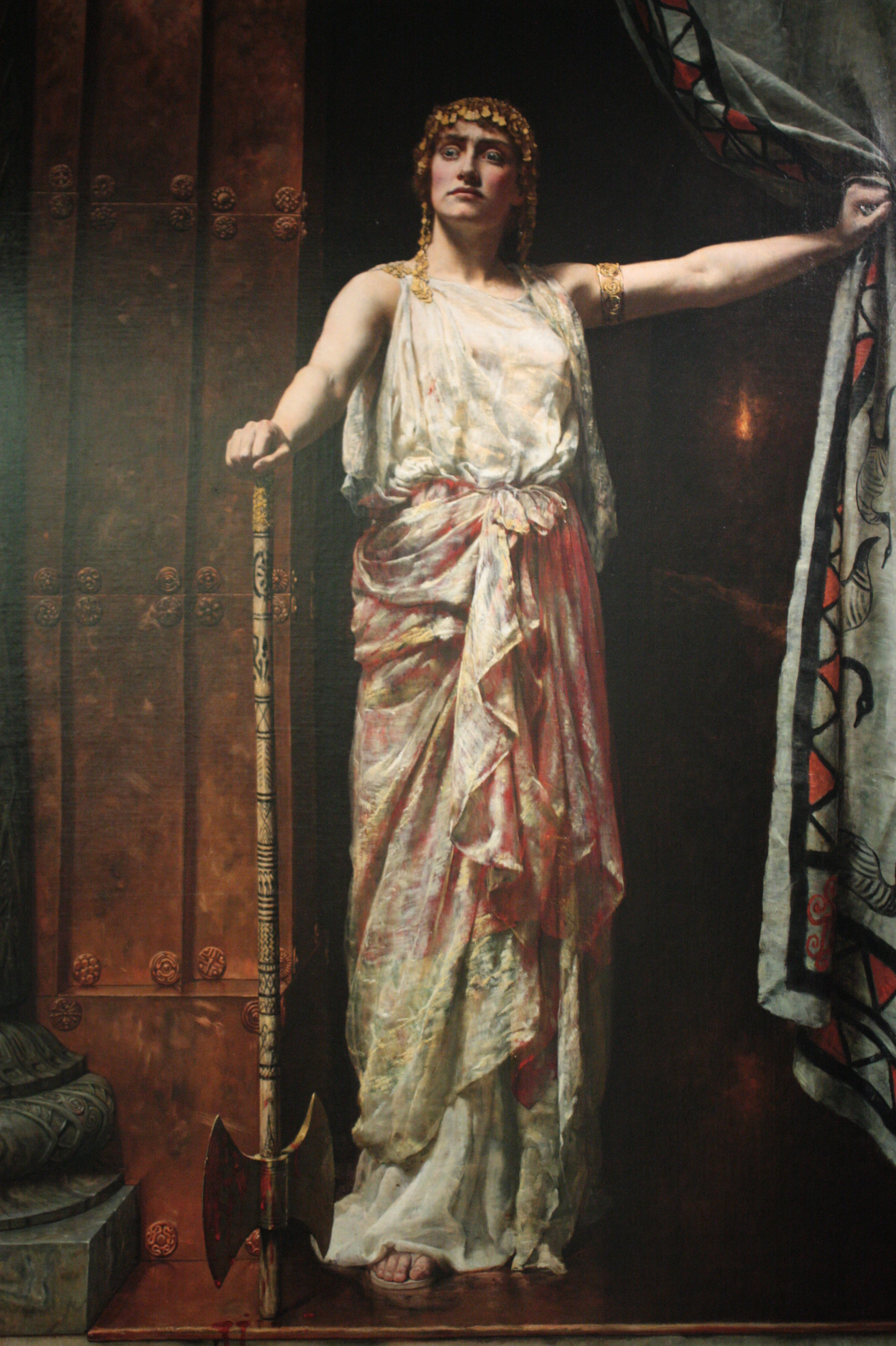
- Clytemnestra by John Collier, 1882
- Region: Sparta, then Mycenae

Genealogy
- Parents: Tyndareus (father); Leda (mother)
- Siblings: Castor and Pollux, Helen, Philonoe, Phoebe, Timandra
- Spouse: Tantalus, Agamemnon, Aegisthus
- Children: Orestes, Electra, Iphigenia, Chrysothemis, Iphianassa, Aletes, Erigone, Helen

In Greek mythology, Clytemnestra (Note: Pronunciation: /ˌklaɪtəmˈnɛstrə/ UK also /klaɪtəmˈniːstrə/ Ancient Greek: Κλυταιμνήστρα, romanized: Klutaimnḗstra, pronounced [klytai̯mnɛ̌ːstraː]) is the wife of Agamemnon, king of Mycenae, and the half-sister of Helen of Troy. With Agamemnon, she is the mother of Iphigenia, Orestes, Electra, and Chrysothemis. She appears as a character in multiple ancient Greek works, including the Homeric epics and plays by Aeschylus, Sophocles, and Euripides. She is infamous for murdering Agamemnon and the Trojan princess Cassandra, whom Agamemnon had taken as a war prize, when they returned from the Trojan War. In Homer's Iliad, her role in Agamemnon's death is unclear and her character is significantly more subdued. However, in the Odyssey, Agamemnon's ghost tells Odysseus about Clytemnestra's role in his brutal murder.

== Name ==
Her Greek name Klytaimnḗstra is also sometimes Latinized as Clytaemnestra. It is commonly glossed as "famed for her suitors." However, this form is a later misreading motivated by an erroneous etymological connection to the verb mnáomai (μνάoμαι, "woo, court"). The original form is believed to have been Klytaimḗstra (Κλυταιμήστρα) without the -n-. The present form of the name does not appear before the middle Byzantine period. Homeric poetry shows an awareness of both etymologies.

Aeschylus, in certain wordplays on her name, appears to assume an etymological link with the verb mḗdomai (μήδoμαι, "scheme, contrive"). Thus given the derivation from κλῠτός (klutós "celebrated") and μήδομαι (mḗdomai "to plan, be cunning"), this would result in the quite descriptive "famous plotter".

== Background ==
=== Parentage ===
Clytemnestra was one of the children born to Tyndareus and Leda, king and queen of Sparta; her full siblings included Castor, Philonoe, Phoebe and Timandra. Her mother Leda also slept with Zeus (in the guise of a swan), producing Clytemnestra's half-siblings Pollux and Helen, and sometimes Castor too, though in many versions Helen's birth is separate from that of the Dioscuri. Additionally, sometimes Helen is a daughter of Zeus by the goddess Nemesis, making her the adoptive sister of Tyndareus and Leda's children.

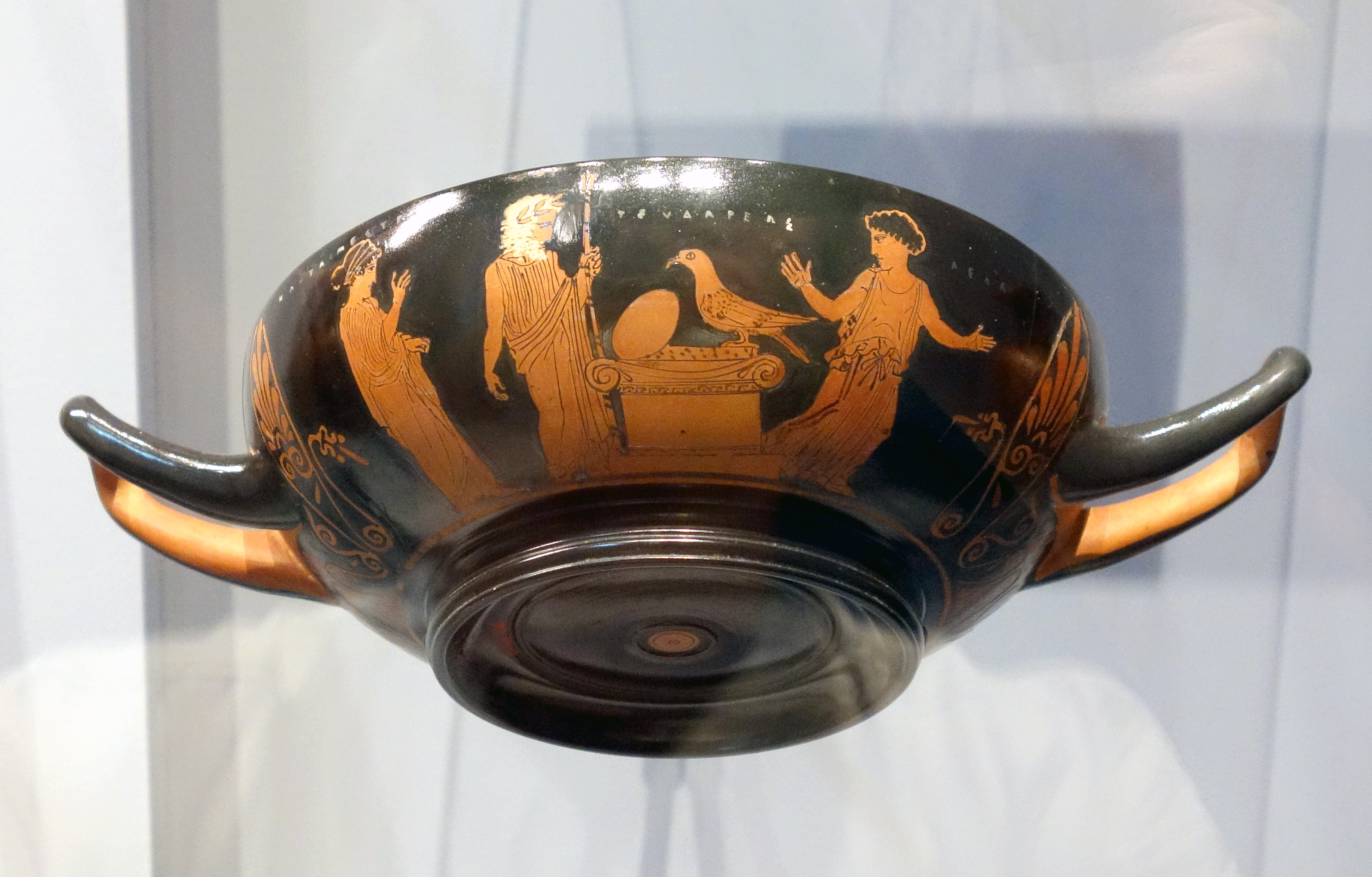
An already grown-up Clytemnestra (left) watches the egg containing Helen about to hatch on an Athenian red-figure cup by the Xenotimos Painter, c. 430–420 BC, Museum of Fine Arts, Boston.

Although referring to Clytemnestra and Helen as twins (born to different fathers) is common in modern interpretations, ancient sources do not support this; the first author to mention a single event of shared egg birth of all four (Clytemnestra, Helen and the Dioscuri) was the First Vatican Mythographer followed by the Third Vatican Mythographer, (Note: The phrase "and Clytemnestra" in Apollodorus' account of Leda's birth of Helen and the Dioscuri was inserted conjecturally by modern editors; he mentions no egg for this event, only for the version where Helen's mother is Nemesis. Apollodorus is also the first mythographer to have Leda explicitly sleep with Zeus and Tyndareus on the same night — though this is probably also implied by Pindar, but only for Castor and Pollux at any point.) and the origin of the sisters as twins is unclear. The duality of the Dioscuri, who are twins in multiple sources, seems to have been contagious and spread over to various figures around them, including their sisters. Pairing Clytemnestra with Helen might have been for the purpose of strengthening her association with Sparta.

=== Marriage and progeny ===
Clytemnestra is most commonly described as having two husbands: Agamemnon and Aegisthus. Some sources name a third, Tantalus, whom Agamemnon slays before taking Clytemnestra as his wife. The child Clytemnestra has with her first husband is killed too. Another myth says both Agamemnon and his brother Menelaus, King of Sparta, compete as suitors for Clytemnestra and Helen's hands, with Agamemnon marrying Clytemnestra and Menelaus marrying Helen. Clytemnestra becomes queen of Mycenae through the marriage and bears Agamemnon four children: Orestes, Electra, Iphigenia, and Chrysothemis. Some time after Agamemnon leaves for Troy, Clytemnestra begins an affair with Aegisthus, son of Thyestes and her husband's cousin. After murdering Agamemnon, they rule Mycenae as king and queen consort. They have a son, Aletes, and two daughters, Erigone and Helen.

According to Stesichorus, Tyndareus forgets to honor Aphrodite while sacrificing to the gods. Angry at Tyndareus for excluding her, the goddess curses his daughters to be adulterous wives.

== Mythology ==
After Helen is taken by Paris to Troy, her husband, Menelaus, asks all Helen's suitors, including Agamemnon, to help retrieve her. Greek forces gather at the port city of Aulis, but consistently weak winds prevent the fleet from sailing to Troy. The priest Calchas prophesies that the winds will be favorable if Agamemnon sacrifices his daughter Iphigenia to the goddess Artemis to atone for killing her sacred deer. Agamemnon persuades Clytemnestra to send Iphigenia to him, telling her he is going to marry her to the hero Achilles. When Iphigenia arrives at Aulis, she is sacrificed, the winds turn, and the troops set sail for Troy.

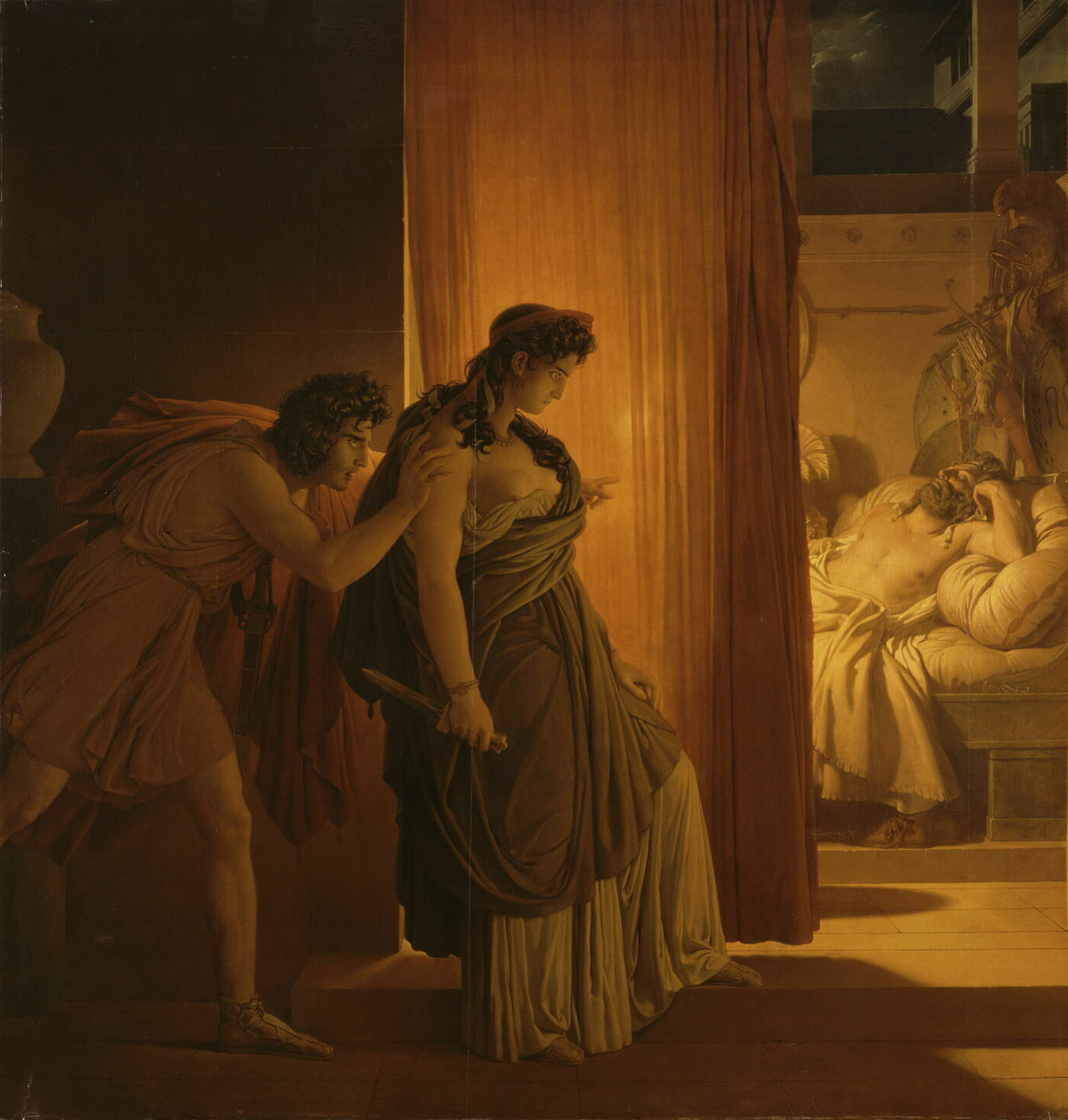
Murder of Agamemnon, painting by Pierre-Narcisse Guérin (1817)

The Trojan War lasts ten years. During this period of Agamemnon's long absence, Clytemnestra begins a love affair with Aegisthus, her husband's cousin and the son of Thyestes. Whether Clytemnestra is seduced into the affair or enters into it independently differs among authors and versions of the myth. Together, the pair begins plotting Agamemnon's demise. Depending on the version of the myth, different reasons have been given for Clytemnestra's decision to murder her husband. These include being angered by the sacrifice of Iphigenia, being seduced into the idea by Aegisthus so that he could take the throne and avenge his father, and being insulted by Agamemnon taking Cassandra as a concubine and giving her preferential treatment. (Note: Attributed to multiple references:)

=== Murder of Agamemnon ===
After defeating the Trojans, Agamemnon returns to Mycenae. He brings with him a war prize: Cassandra, a seer cursed by Apollo so that her prophecies will never be believed. Upon his return, Agamemnon is murdered either by Aegisthus, Clytemnestra, or the two acting together. The character who strikes the killing blow and Clytemnestra's characterization differ between authors and versions of the myth.

In Aeschylus' play Agamemnon, one of the better-known versions of the story, Clytemnestra is portrayed as a conniving, bloodthirsty woman whose desires are encouraged by Aegisthus, wanting to avenge his father. In the play, Clytemnestra welcomes her husband home and helps him down from his chariot before escorting him into the palace. Cassandra remains outside in the chariot, where she receives a premonition and prophesies that Clytemnestra will murder Agamemnon; a crowd watches and listens, but is unable to comprehend what she says. In this version of the story, Clytemnestra waits until Agamemnon is in his bath before she entangles him in a net and stabs him three times. Cassandra, accepting her fate, walks into the palace and is killed as well. When Clytemnestra's act is discovered by the crowd, she revels in the deed and defends her actions, announcing that she has finally avenged Iphigenia's murder.

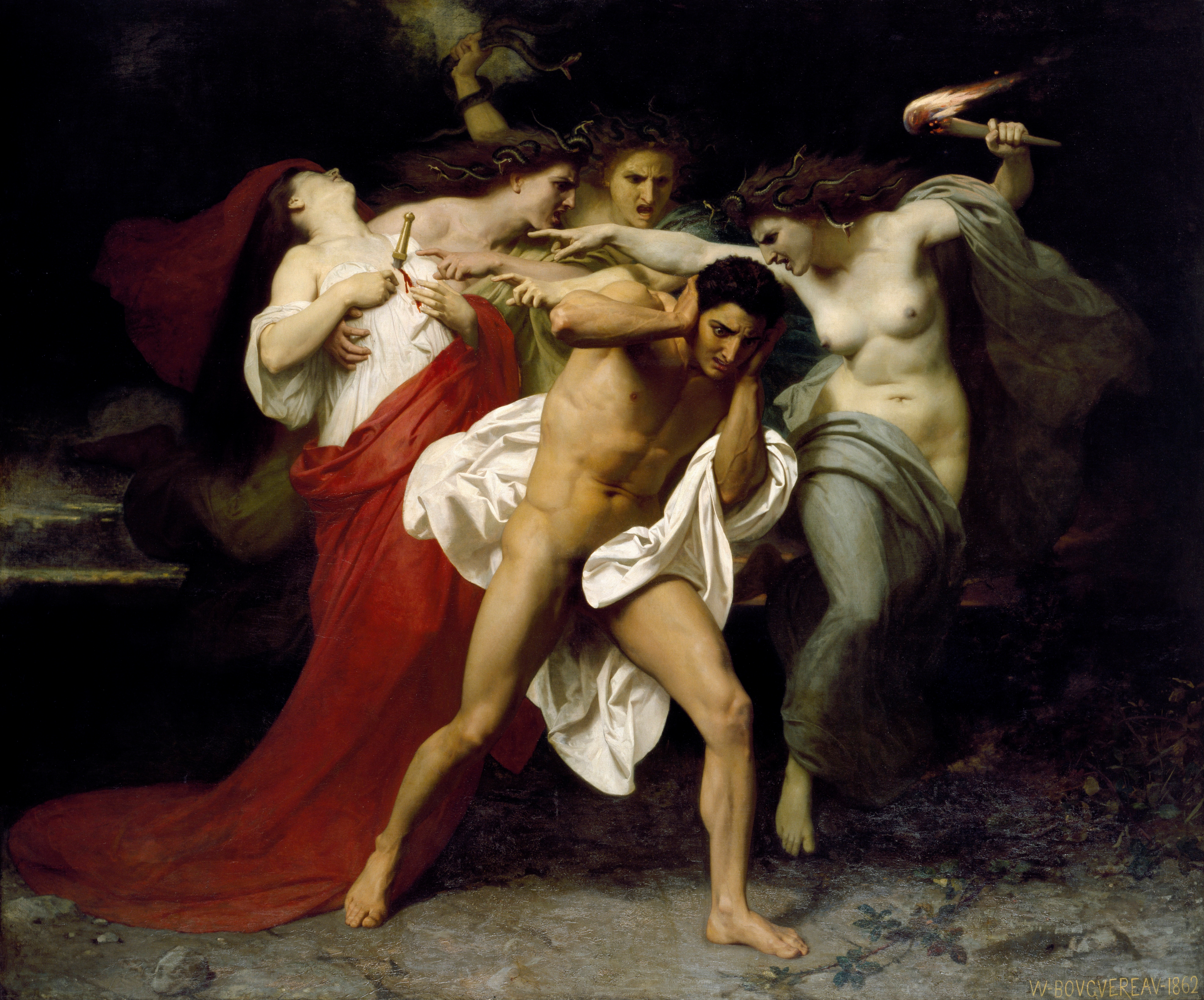
Orestes Pursued by the Furies by William-Adolphe Bouguereau. Clytemnestra was killed by Orestes and the Furies tormented him for committing matricide.

In Euripides' Electra, Electra claims that, while her mother was involved in the plot, Aegisthus was the one who struck the killing blow. Alternately, Homer has the pair acting together. In the Odyssey, Agamemnon's shade claims that Aegisthus and Clytemnestra hosted a feast, during which the pair launched a surprise attack and murdered him alongside a number of his soldiers. In this version, Clytemnestra alone killed Cassandra.

=== Death ===
After the murders, Aegisthus takes the throne and rules Mycenae with Clytemnestra as his queen. During this time, they have three children: a son, Aletes, and two daughters, Erigone and Helen. After seven years, Orestes returns home to Mycenae, intent on taking revenge for the death of his father. With Electra's help, he murders Clytemnestra, Aegisthus, and their children. Clytemnestra curses Orestes with her dying breath, and he is haunted by the Erinyes, the goddesses of vengeance.

After being freed from the Erinyes' torment, Orestes takes the throne of Mycenae. In some versions of the myth, he takes his half-sister, Erigone, as a wife. Together they have two children: Tisamenus and Penthilus.

== Appearance in later works ==
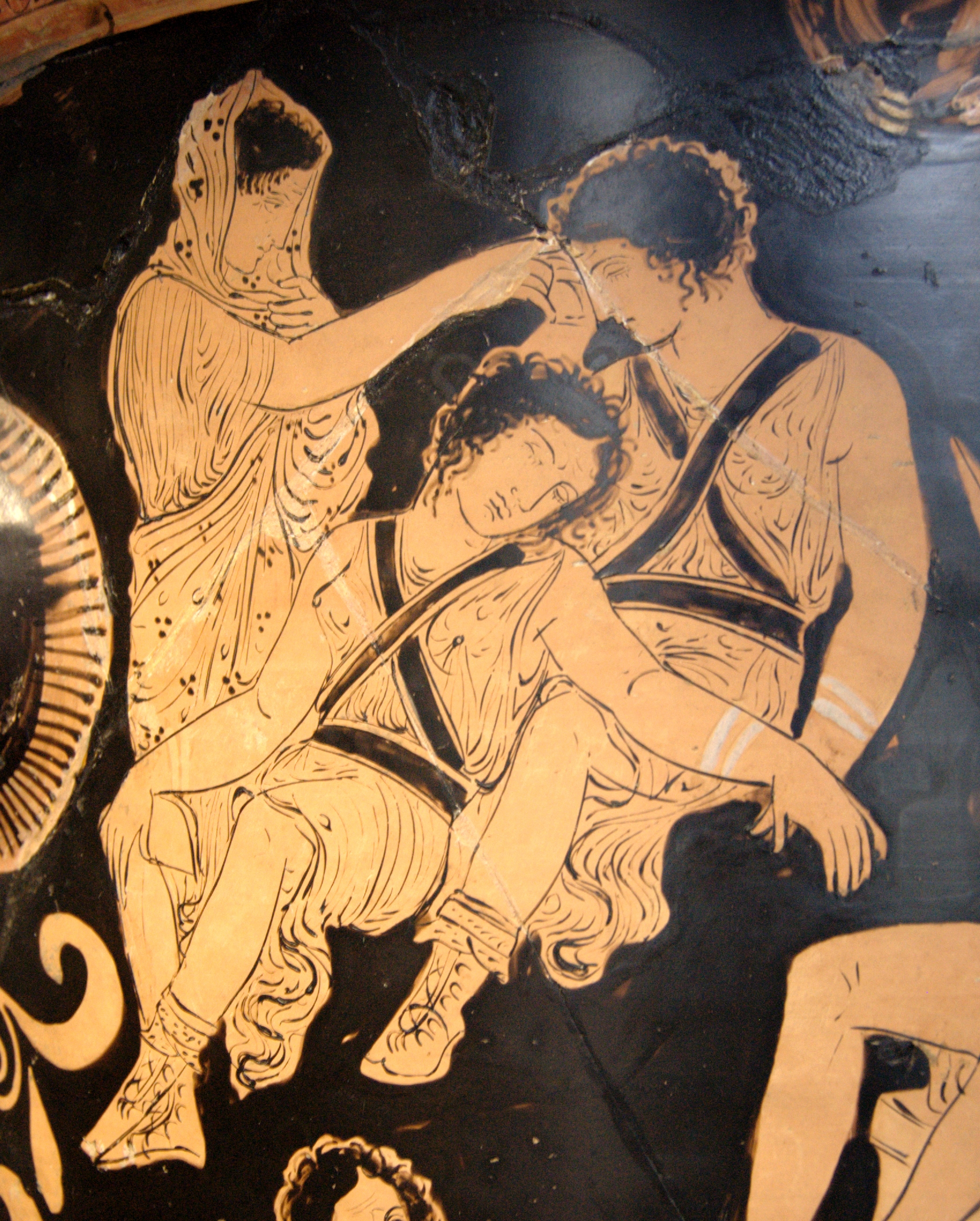
Clytemnestra trying to wake the Erinyes while her son is being purified by Apollo, Apulian red-figure krater, 480–470 BC, Louvre (Cp 710)

Clytemnestra appears in numerous works from ancient to modern times, sometimes as a villain and sometimes as a sympathetic antihero. Author and classicist Madeline Miller wrote "[a]fter Medea, Queen Clytemnestra is probably the most notorious woman in Greek mythology".

- Clytemnestra is one of the main characters in Aeschylus's Oresteia, and is central to the plot of all three parts. She murders Agamemnon in the first play, and is murdered herself in the second. Her death then leads to the trial of Orestes by a jury composed of Athena and 12 Athenians in the final play. Her role is the largest in any surviving Greek tragedy.
- In Elektra, Richard Strauss one-act opera with libretto by Hugo von Hofmannsthal, and based off of Sophocles's tragedy Electra, Clytemnestra is cursed with nightmares about her eventual death at the hands of her son, Orestes.
- In Mourning Becomes Electra, Eugene O'Neill's retelling of the Oresteia by Aeschylus, Clytemnestra is renamed Christine Mannon.
- In Ferdinando Baldi's The Forgotten Pistolero, a Spaghetti Western adaptation of the Oresteia, Clytemnestra is named Anna Carrasco and is portrayed by Luciana Paluzzi.
- The American modern dancer and choreographer Martha Graham created a two-hour ballet, Clytemnestra (1958), about the queen.
- The Aeschylus work was also adapted by South African composer Cromwell Everson into the first Afrikaans opera, Klutaimnestra, in 1967. In four acts, the opera premiered on November 7, 1967, in Biesenbach Hall, Worcester, Western Cape, South Africa.
- John Eaton composed an opera in one act entitled The Cry of Clytemnestra recounting the events leading up to and including Clytemnestra's murder of Agamemnon.
- In the 1977 film adaptation Iphigenia, Clytemnestra is portrayed by the Greek actress Irene Papas.
- In the 2003 miniseries Helen of Troy, Clytemnestra is played by Katie Blake.
- Clytemnestra appears as an extremely abusive mother in the play Molora, Yaël Farber's 2007 rewriting of the Oresteia set in post-apartheid South Africa and its Truth and Reconciliation Commission hearings.
- The 2017 novel House of Names by Colm Tóibín is a retelling of the Oresteia, with divine elements largely removed. There are three narrators: Clytemnestra, Orestes, and Electra.
- Clytemnestra is one of several narrators of A Thousand Ships (2019) by Natalie Haynes, which retells the Trojan War from the perspective of the women involved.
- Clytemnestra is the protagonist of the eponymous novel Clytemnestra (2023) by Costanza Casati.
- An asteroid 179 Klytaemnestra is named after Clytemnestra.
- In Christopher Nolan's film The Odyssey (2026), Lupita Nyong'o portrays both Clytemnestra and her sister Helen.

== Bibliography ==
- Aeschylus, Agamemnon in Aeschylus, with an English translation by Herbert Weir Smyth, Ph. D. in two volumes. 2.Agamemnon. Herbert Weir Smyth, Ph. D. Cambridge, MA. Harvard University Press. 1926. Available at Perseus Digital Library.
- Apollodorus, The Library, with an English Translation by Sir James George Frazer, F.B.A., F.R.S. in 2 Volumes. Cambridge, MA, Harvard University Press; London, William Heinemann Ltd. 1921. Online version at the Perseus Digital Library.
- Edmunds, Lowell (2017). "6: Helen in Pseudo-Apollodorus Book 3". In Pàmias, Jordi (ed.). Apollodoriana. Sozomena: Studies in the Recovery of Ancient Texts. Vol. 16. De Gruyter. ISBN 978-3-11-054074-1.
- Euripides, Helen in Euripides. The Complete Greek Drama, edited by Whitney J. Oates and Eugene O'Neill, Jr. in two volumes. 2. Helen, translated by E. P. Coleridge. New York. Random House. 1938. Available at Perseus Digital Library.
- Euripides, Iphigenia in Aulis in The Plays of Euripides, translated by E. P. Coleridge. Volume II. London. George Bell and Sons. 1891. Available at Perseus Digital Library.
- Gantz, Timothy (1993). Early Greek Myth: A Guide to Literary and Artistic Sources. Vol. I. Johns Hopkins University Press. ISBN 978-0-8018-5360-9.
- Gavitt, Katharine (2021). Twins on Two Stages: The Dioscuri in the Performances of Sparta and Athens (PDF) (Thesis). Wellesley College.
- Homer, The Iliad with an English Translation by A.T. Murray, PhD in two volumes. Cambridge, MA., Harvard University Press; London, William Heinemann, Ltd. 1924. Online version at the Perseus Digital Library.
- Homer; The Odyssey with an English Translation by A.T. Murray, PH.D. in two volumes. Cambridge, MA., Harvard University Press; London, William Heinemann, Ltd. 1919. Online version at the Perseus Digital Library.
- Hyginus, Gaius Julius, The Myths of Hyginus, edited and translated by Mary A. Grant, Lawrence: University of Kansas Press, 1960. Available on Topos Text.
- Gaius Julius Hyginus, Astronomica from The Myths of Hyginus translated and edited by Mary Grant. University of Kansas Publications in Humanistic Studies. Online version at the Topos Text Project.
- Ovid, Amores with an English translation by Christopher Marlowe, Ed. Available at Perseus Digital Library.
- Pepin, Ronald E. (2008). The Vatican Mythographers. New York City: Fordham University Press. ISBN 978-0-8232-2892-8.
- Seneca the Elder, Agamemnon in The Ten Tragedies of Seneca, translated into English by Watson Bradshaw. 1903. S. Sonnenschein & Co. Internet archive.
- Stasinus, Cypria in The Homeric Hymns and Homerica with an English Translation by Hugh G. Evelyn-White. Homeric Hymns. Cambridge, Massachusetts, Harvard University Press; London, William Heinemann Ltd. 1914. Available online at Internet Archive.
