= Electra (Sophocles play) =

Ancient-Greek tragedy by Sophocles

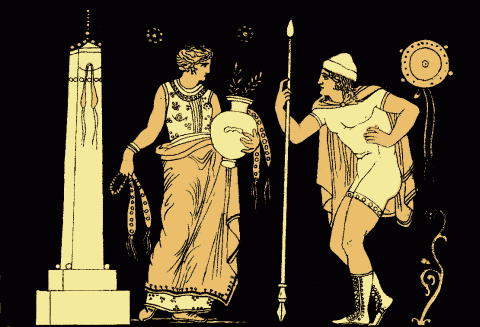
- Electra and Orestes by Alfred Church
- Original language: Ancient Greek
- Written by: Sophocles
- Chorus: Women of Mycenae
- Characters: Paedagogus; Orestes; Electra; Chrysothemis; Clytemnestra; Aegisthus
- Mute: Pylades; Handmaid of Clytemnestra; The Attendants of Orestes
- Genre: Greek tragedy
- Setting: Mycenae, before the palace of the Pelopidae

Premiere
- Date: c. 420–414 BC
- Place: City Dionysia

Electra (Ancient Greek: Ἠλέκτρα, Ēlektra, also called The Electra), is a Greek tragedy by Sophocles. The original publication date is not known, but various stylistic similarities with the Philoctetes (409 BC) and the Oedipus at Colonus (406 BC) leads scholars to believe it was written towards the end of Sophocles' career. Richard Claverhouse Jebb dates it between 420 BC and 414 BC.

== Background ==
During the Trojan War, King Agamemnon of Mycenae sacrifices his oldest daughter Iphigenia to the goddess Artemis in order to ensure favorable weather and winds when sailing for Troy after offending the goddess. When King Agamemnon returns from the Trojan War, his wife Clytemnestra and her lover Aegisthus (Agamemnon's cousin) kill him. Clytemnestra believes the murder was justified since Agamemnon had sacrificed their daughter. Electra, a younger daughter of Agamemnon and Clytemnestra, rescued her younger brother Orestes from her mother by sending him to Strophius of Phocis.

== Plot ==
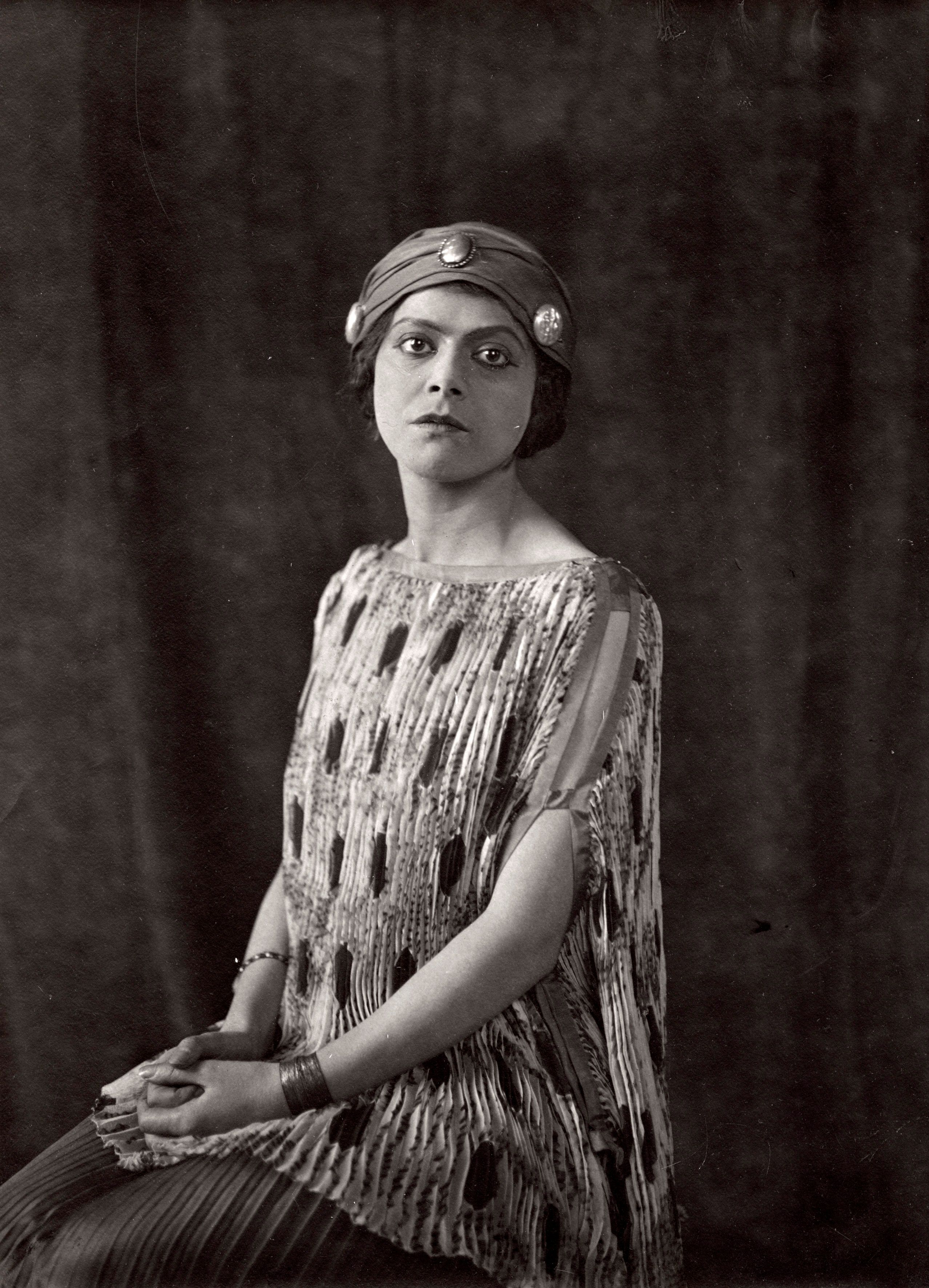
Dutch actress Marie Hamel in costume as Clytemnestra (1920)

Set in the city of Mycenae, Greece, a few years after the Trojan War, the play tells the story of Electra and her brother Orestes, who are haunted by the murder of their father Agamemnon by their mother Clytemnestra and their stepfather Aegisthus. The play begins years later when Orestes has returned as a grown man with a plot for revenge, as well as to claim the throne.

Orestes arrives with his friend Pylades, son of Strophius, and a pedagogue, i.e. tutor. The tutor is an old attendant of Orestes, who took him from Mycenae to Strophius after the death of his father. Electra told him to take Orestes because he remained loyal to Agamemnon. They discuss a plan to get revenge for the death of Orestes's father. They plan to have the tutor announce that Orestes has died in a chariot race and that two men (really Orestes and Pylades) are arriving shortly to deliver an urn with his remains. Meanwhile, Electra continues to publicly mourn the death of her father Agamemnon, holding her mother Clytemnestra responsible for his murder. During the time since she helped him escape, Electra has waited for Orestes to return to Mycenae.

Electra's sister, Chrysothemis, enters and chides Electra for still holding resentment for their father's death for so long, saying they have no power to change what has happened. Electra becomes angry at the idea that Chrysothemis is defending those who killed their father and favoring their mother. Chrysothemis then tells Electra that as soon as their step-father returns from his visit to the countryside, if she continues to lament Agamemnon's death, she'll be imprisoned for life. Chrysothemis goes to leave to lay tributes on their father's grave, which she was ordered to do by Clytemnestra after she had a dream of Agamemnon haunting her. Electra convinces her to not do that on her mother's behalf, since to her their mother detested their father so greatly.

Clytemnestra enters and begins trying to make Electra understand her reasoning for killing Agamemnon. She tells her of his betrayal to the goddess Artemis, and that if he had killed Iphigenia for any other reason he would have had to pay. Electra argues that whether justly or not, she killed him, which Electra cannot forgive her for. Immediately after, the tutor enters and informs Clytemnestra and Electra of Orestes's "death". When Electra is told of the death of Orestes her grief becomes worse. Clytemnestra becomes more calm at the news and leaves. Chrysothemis enters and tells Electra to be happy again because she saw Orestes laying tributes on their father's tomb, which Electra doesn't believe. She tells Chrysothemis of Orestes's death. Chrysothemis leaves and Electra laments.

Orestes arrives carrying the urn supposedly containing his ashes. He does not recognize Electra, nor does she recognize him. He gives her the urn and she delivers a moving lament over it, unaware that her brother is, in fact, standing alive next to her. He learns of Electra's anger of the death of their father, and over the death of Orestes, and she demands to take the urn containing his ashes. Orestes declines and reveals his identity to his sister. She is overjoyed that he is alive, but in their excitement, they nearly reveal his identity out loud, and the tutor comes out from the palace to urge them on. Electra joins her brother's plot. She stays back and watches out for Aegisthus to return. Orestes and Pylades enter the house and slay Clytemnestra. As Aegisthus returns home, Electra keeps him briefly occupied talking about the messengers who brought the news of Orestes death and leading Aegisthus to Clytemnestra's room. There, Orestes and Pylades put Clytemnestra's corpse under a sheet and then present it to Aegisthus as the body of Orestes. He lifts the veil to discover who it really is, and Orestes then reveals himself. They escort Aegisthus offstage to be killed at the hearth, the same location where Agamemnon was slain. The play ends before the death of Aegisthus is announced, with the chorus telling the siblings they were successful in their mission and restored respect to their father's name.

== Characters ==
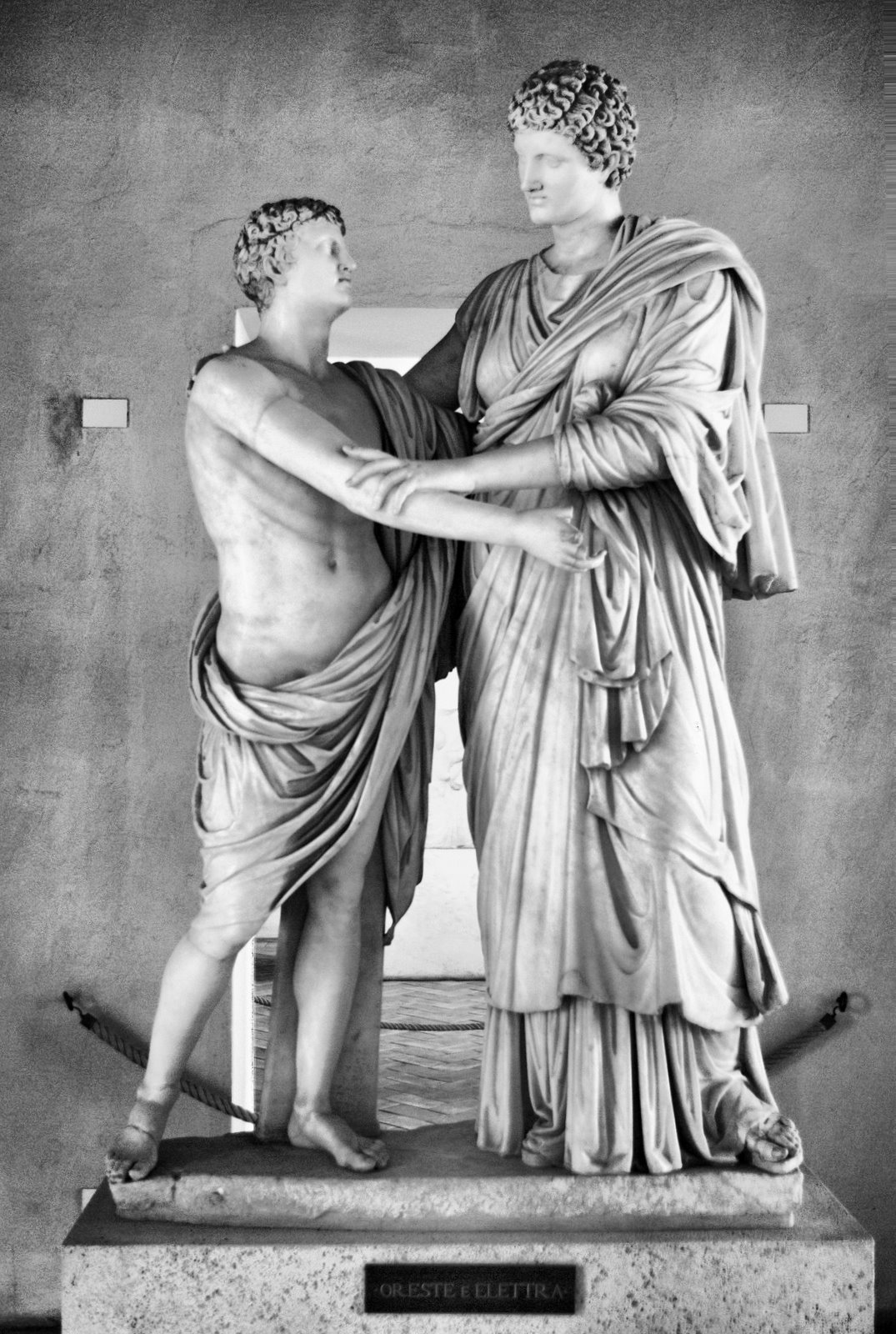
Statue of Orestes and Electra, National Museum, Rome

Speaking roles:

- Electra is the daughter of Clytemnestra and Agamemnon, sister of Orestes and Chrysothemis. She mourns her father after his death, and refuses to forgive her mother; she eventually joins the plan to kill her mother and stepfather.
- Orestes is the son of Clytemnestra and Agamemnon, brother of Electra and Chrysothemis. Plots to kill his mother and stepfather and retake the throne.
- The chorus, a group of Mycenae women who follow mainly Electra around. They serve as a diagetic source of musical information; the audience and characters can hear them and the characters can respond and interact with them. The chorus is integral to convincing Electra to go along with the plan.
- Clytemnestra, the mother of Electra, Orestes, Chrysothemis, and Iphigenia. Wife of Agamemnon before killing him and taking Aegisthus as her lover.
- Aegisthus, Agamemnon's cousin and lover of Clytemnestra.
- A tutor, Orestes personal attendant and confident, a loyalist to Agamemnon.
- Chrysothemis, the daughter of Clytemnestra and Agamemnon, sister to Electra and Orestes. Mourns her father like Electra, but urges her to forgive their mother to stay in her good graces.

Non-speaking roles:

- Pylades, a friend of Orestes, who helps him kill Clytemnestra and Aegisthus.
- A handmaiden of Clytemnestra
- A servant's of Orestes

== Similar works ==
The story of Orestes' revenge was a popular subject in Greek tragedies.

- There are surviving versions by all three of the great Athenian tragedians:
  - The Libation Bearers (458 BC), in the Oresteia trilogy by Aeschylus
  - Electra, a play by Euripides, probably in the early to mid 410s BC, likely before 413 BC, that tells a very different version of this same basic story from Sophocles. This Euripides version includes a marriage for Electra, as well as a more involved role in the killing of their mother and stepfather.
- The Oresteia story was retold in a Russian Opera composed from 1887–1894 by Sergei Taneyev. A French version of the opera was written by Darius Milhaud and translated by Paul Claudel.
- The story was told at the end of the lost epic poem Nostoi (also known as Returns or Returns of the Greeks).
- The events are brought up in Homer's Odyssey. Events preceding are brought up in the Iliad, with the death of Iphigenia being alluded to.

== Reception ==
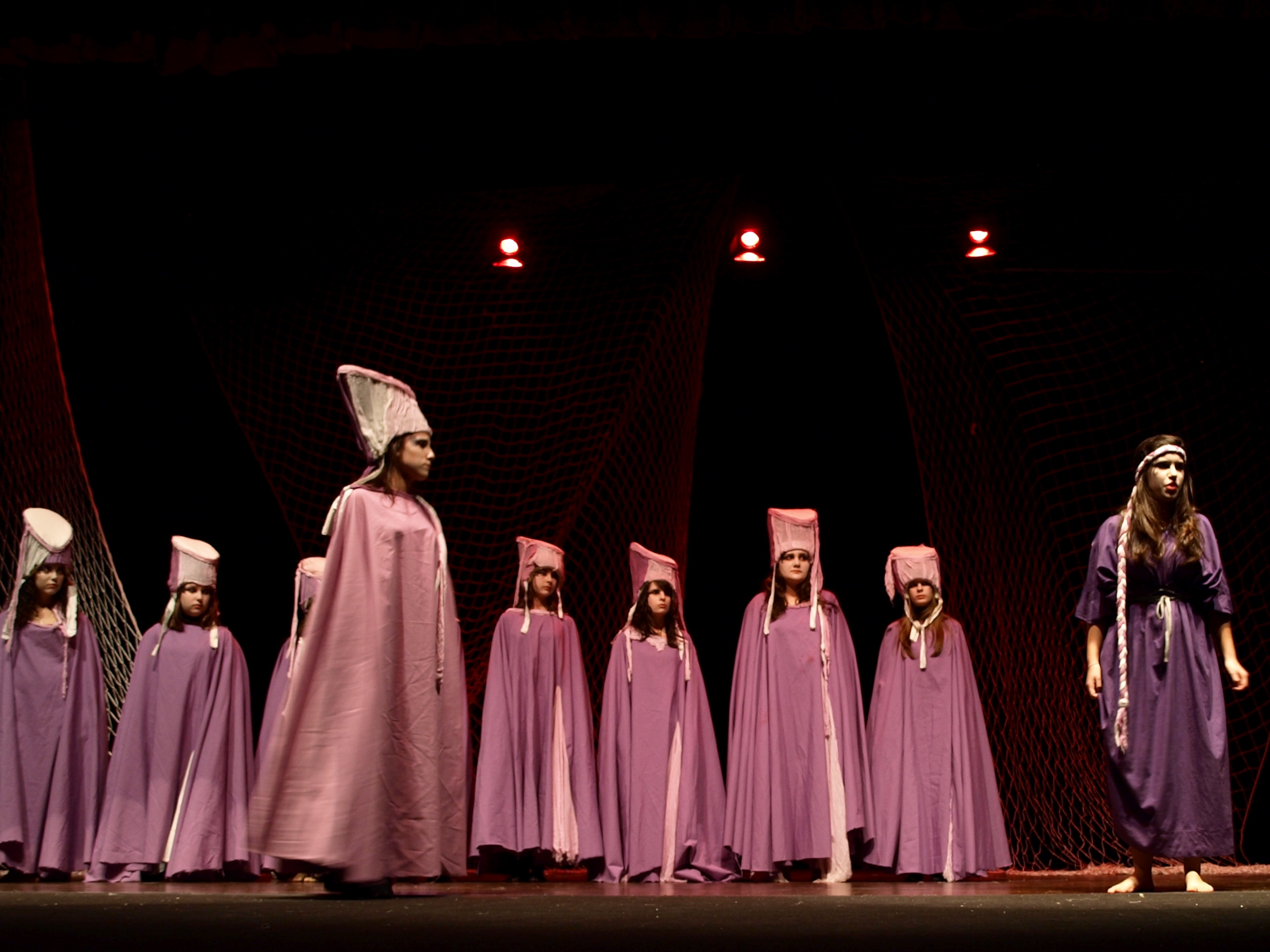
Scene from a 2010 Spanish production: the chorus is the women of Mycenae; Electra is at far right.

Roman writer Cicero considered Electra a masterpiece, and the work is also viewed favorably among modern critics and scholars.

Many modern scholars consider the dichotomy between the two main characters. They draw attention to this common trope in Sophocles' writing—putting two characters who are completely different in a scene at the same time to dramatize their differences.

In The Reader's Encyclopedia of World Drama, John Gassner and Edward Quinn argue that its "simple device of delaying the recognition between brother and sister produces a series of brilliant scenes which display Electra's heroic resolution under constant attack." Of the titular character, Edith Hall wrote, "Sophocles certainly found an effective dramatic vehicle in this remarkable figure, driven by deprivation and cruelty into near-psychotic extremes of behavior; no other character in his extant dramas dominates the stage to such an extent." L.A. Post noted that the play was "unique among Greek tragedies for its emphasis on action." For John Woodard, the parallel in order to dramatize reactions is drawn between many of the characters, not just Electra and Orestes.

== Commentaries ==
- Davies, Gilbert Austin, 1908 (abridged from the larger edition of Richard Claverhouse Jebb)
- Finglass, P. J., ed. (2007). Sophocles: Electra. Cambridge Classical Texts and Commentaries 44. Cambridge/New York: Cambridge University Press. ISBN 978-0-521-86809-9.; Kovacs, David (August 3, 2009). "Review of Finglass (2007)". Bryn Mawr Classical Review.

== Translations ==
- Edward Plumptre, 1878 – verse: (full text available at Wikisource)
- Lewis Campbell, 1883 – verse
- Richard C. Jebb, 1894 – prose (full text available at Wikisource)
- Francis Storr, 1919 – verse (full text, with audio, available at Wikisource)
- Francis Fergusson, 1938 – verse
- E.F. Watling 1953 – prose
- David Grene, 1957 – verse
- H. D. F. Kitto, 1962 – verse
- J. H. Kells, 1973 – verse (?)
- Kenneth McLeish, 1979 – verse
- Frank McGuinness, 1997 – verse
- Henry Taylor, 1998 – verse
- Anne Carson, 2001 – verse
- Jenny March, 2001 – prose (acting edition)
- Tom McGrath, 2003 – prose; full text
- M. MacDonald and J. M. Walton, 2004 – verse
- G. Theodoridis, 2006 – prose: full text
- Eric Dugdale, 2008 – verse (acting edition)
- Timberlake Wertenbaker, 2009
- Paul Roche, 2010- verse
- Nick Payne, 2011
- Mary Lefkowitz, 2016 – verse
- Ian C. Johnston, 2017 – verse: full text

== Adaptations ==
- Electra (1714)- Lewis Theobald
- Elektra (play), a 1903 adaptation by Hugo von Hofmannsthal
- Elektra, Op. 58, a 1909 one-act opera by Richard Strauss
- Elektra: A Play by Ezra Pound and Rudd Fleming, written in 1949, published 1989 by Princeton University Press
- Electra, an opera by Mikis Theodorakis (1995)
- Elektra (2010 film), a 2010 Malayalam psychological drama film co-written and directed by Shyamaprasad
- Elektra: a 2022 mythology novel by Jennifer Saint. It follows the story of Electra through 3 different women involved: Electra, Clytemnestra, and Cassandra.
- Elektra, a 2025 adaptation/translation by poet Anne Carson, directed by Daniel Fish and starring Brie Larson. Staged at the Theatre Royal, Brighton (13 to 18 January 2025) and Duke of York's Theatre, London (24 January to 12 April 2025).
- Electra/Persona, a 2026 adaptation by Benedict Andrews for the National Theatre, paired with an adaptation of Ingmar Bergman's Persona, starring Cate Blanchett and Nina Hoss.
