= Penthilus (son of Orestes) =

Mythological son of Orestes

Penthilus (/ˈpɛnθɪləs/; Ancient Greek: Πένθιλος, romanized: Pénthilos) is the illegitimate or legitimate son of half-siblings Orestes and Erigone in Greek mythology.

== Family ==
Penthilus' grandmother was Clytemnestra. His maternal and paternal grandfathers were Aigisthos and Agamemnon respectively. Penthilus fathered two sons, Echelatus (Echelas or Archelaüs), and Damasias (Damasius), father of Agorius.

== Mythology ==
Orestes killed both Clytemnestra, who was his own mother and Aigisthos. Erigone is said to have hanged herself or married Orestes after the latter's first wife, Hermione, died. Orestes was ruler over much of the Peloponnese and died of a snakebite at age 70. One story says that as a child, Penthilus was torn apart and devoured by wolves in the Taygetus mountains, near Sparta. His father established a festival of mourning, the so-called Penthilia in his honour. In some accounts, he ruled the Argives with his half-brother Tisamenus.

According to Pausanias, Penthilus grew up and founded a city either on Lesbos or in Thrace. Penthilus was the mythical ancestor of the Penthilides, an ancient dynasty of kings on Lesbos. His son, Echelas was the father of Gras, the founder of the city Aeolis, between Ionia and Mysia. In some accounts, Penthilus instead led a colony of Aeolians to Thrace.
