= Chrysothemis (daughter of Agamemnon) =

Daughter of Agamemnon

- Princess of Mycenae
- Chrysothemis flees as Orestes kills Aegisthus on an Attic red-figure pelike c. 500 BC, Kunsthistorisches Museum in Vienna, Austria.
- Greek: Χρυσόθεμις
- Dynasty: Atreidae
- Gender: Female
- Region: Mycenae

Genealogy
- Born: Mycenae
- Parents: Agamemnon and Clytemnestra
- Siblings: Iphianassa, Iphigenia, Electra, Laodice, Orestes

In Greek mythology, Chrysothemis (/krɪˈsɒθɪmɪs/; Ancient Greek: Χρυσόθεμις, romanized: Khrusóthemis, lit. 'golden custom') is a princess of Mycenae, daughter of Agamemnon and Clytemnestra. Unlike her three siblings, Chrysothemis' role in mythology is rather limited and she only appears in a small number of ancient texts, the most notable of them being Sophocles' Electra, a play of the fifth century BC first premiered in Athens.

== Family ==
Chrysothemis is one of the four children born to King Agamemnon and Queen Clytemnestra, sister to Iphigenia (or Iphianassa), Electra (or Laodice) and Orestes. She also had three maternal half-siblings born to her mother and Aegisthus; Aletes, Erigone and Helen.

Although her family's story is found in the fragmentary Catalogue of Women, Chrysothemis herself is omitted from it (as are Laodice and Iphianassa), and no children born to her are recorded.

== Mythology ==
In the Iliad, Agamemnon suggests that any of his three daughters—Iphianassa, Laodice or Chrysothemis—be given as wife to Achilles without receiving bride-price as compensation for Agamemnon taking his slave concubine Briseis away from him. Later, Odysseus repeats the same offer to Achilles when the embassy visits him in his tent to convince him to resume fighting against the Trojans, but is rejected.

=== Electra ===
Chrysothemis' largest role is in the late fifth-century BC play Electra by Sophocles. Set many years after Clytemnestra and Aegisthus' murder of Agamemnon and the young Orestes being whisked out to safety by a tutor, Chrysothemis lives unhappily under the roof of her mother and stepfather but endures in restraint, unlike the outspoken Electra. On the day the grown-up Orestes returns to Mycenae disguised, Clytemnestra orders Chrysothemis to lay libations on Agamemnon's grave after having a disturbing dream of him haunting her. Chrysothemis advises Electra to ease her anger and accept their dire situation, but Electra lashes out at her suggestion and berates Chrysothemis for making peace with the murderers of their father; Chrysothemis then warns Electra of their plan to imprison her once Aegisthus returns from the countryside causing Electra to despair.

When Chrysothemis arrives at the tomb, she sees the libations—that include a cut lock of hair—Orestes has already left there, and insightfully concludes that he is back. She rans back to a sorrowful Electra to announce her the merry news, only for Electra to transfer to her the false report of Orestes' death, devastating Chrysothemis. Finally, Electra tries to recruit Chrysothemis for her plan to murder Aegisthus, but Chrysothemis refuses, arguing that as women they are not fit for such actions. Although Electra expected such a reaction, her heart is nevertheless hardened against her sister and accuses her of cowardice, deciding to go ahead with her plan on her own.

== See also ==
- Philonoe
- Phoebe
- Ismene

== Bibliography ==
- Apollodorus, The Library, with an English Translation by Sir James George Frazer, F.B.A., F.R.S. in 2 Volumes. Cambridge, MA, Harvard University Press; London, William Heinemann Ltd. 1921. Online version at the Perseus Digital Library.
- Bloch, René (October 1, 2006). "Chrysothemis". In Cancik, Hubert; Schneider, Helmuth (eds.). Brill's New Pauly. Translated by Christine F. Salazar. Berne: Brill Reference Online. ISSN 1574-9347.
- Euripides, Orestes translated by E. P. Coleridge in The Complete Greek Drama, edited by Whitney J. Oates and Eugene O'Neill, Jr. in two volumes. New York. Random House. 1938. Online available at Perseus Digital Library.
- Hyginus, The Myths of Hyginus, edited and translated by Mary A. Grant, Lawrence: University of Kansas Press, 1960. Available on Topos Text.
- Gantz, Timothy (1993). Early Greek Myth: A Guide to Literary and Artistic Sources. Vol. I. Johns Hopkins University Press. ISBN 978-0-8018-5360-9.
- Homer, The Iliad with an English Translation by A.T. Murray, PhD in two volumes. Cambridge, MA., Harvard University Press; London, William Heinemann, Ltd. 1924. Online version at the Perseus Digital Library.
- Sophocles, The Electra of Sophocles, edited with introduction and notes by Sir Richard Jebb. Sir Richard Jebb. Cambridge. Cambridge University Press. 1894.
- Tripp, Edward (June 1970). Crowell's Handbook of Classical Mythology (1st ed.). Thomas Y. Crowell Co. ISBN 069022608X.
