= Orestes Pursued by the Furies =

Event from Greek mythology

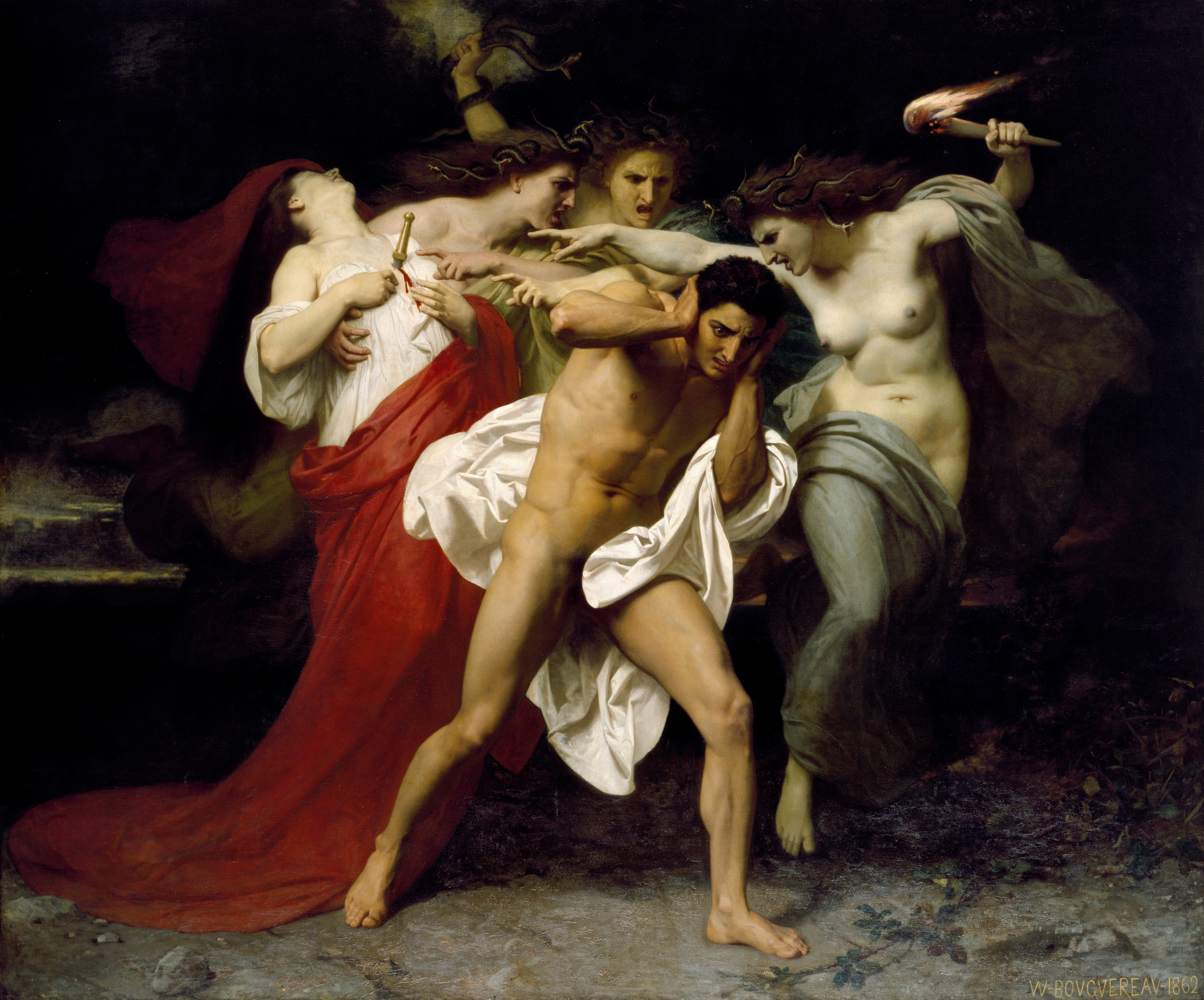
Orestes Pursued by the Furies by William-Adolphe Bouguereau, 1862 (Also known as The Remorse of Orestes)

Orestes Pursued by the Furies is an event from Greek mythology that is a recurring theme in art depicting Orestes.

== Background ==
In the Iliad, the king of Argos, Agamemnon, sacrifices his daughter Iphigenia to Artemis to assure good sailing weather to travel to Troy and fight in the Trojan War. In Agamemnon, the first play of Aeschylus's Oresteia trilogy, Agamemnon's wife, Clytemnestra, and her lover, Aegisthus, murder Agamemnon upon his return home as revenge for sacrificing Iphigenia. In The Libation Bearers, the second play of the Orestia, Agamemnon's son Orestes returns home to take revenge on his mother for murdering his father. Orestes ultimately does murder his mother, and afterward is tormented and chased offstage by The Furies, beings who personify vengeance.

== In art ==
Orestes being tormented by the Furies has been depicted by a number of artists, including the following:

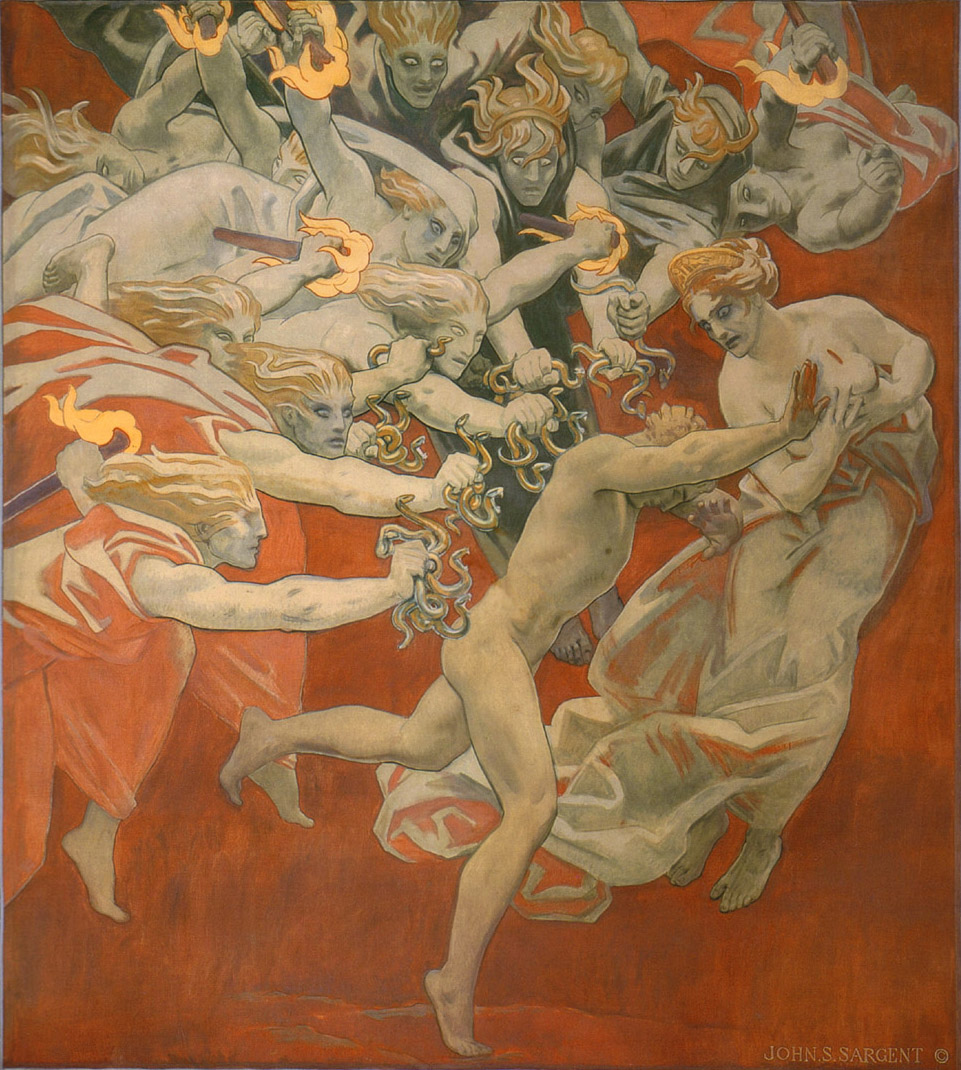
1921, by John Singer Sargent

- Orestes Pursued by the Furies, Louis Lafitte (1790), Ackland Art Museum, Chapel Hill, North Carolina
- Orestes Pursued by the Furies, William-Adolphe Bouguereau (1862), Chrysler Museum of Art
- Orestes Pursued by the Furies, Carl Rahl (1852), State Museum for Art and Cultural History
- Orestes Pursued By The Furies, John Singer Sargent (1921), Museum of Fine Arts, Boston
- Orestes and the Furies, Jacques Francois Ferdinand Lairesse (c. 1850–1929)
- Orestes Pursued by the Furies, Alexander Runciman (c. 1736–1785), National Galleries of Scotland
