= Costanza Casati =

Italian writer

- Born: 1995 (age 30–31); Fort Worth, Texas, U.S.
- Education: Queen Mary University of London (BA); University of Warwick (MA)
- Years active: 2018–present

Costanza Casati (born 1995) is an Italian writer. She authored the Sunday Times-bestselling novels Clytemnestra (2023), which won the Goldsboro Books Glass Bell Award, and Babylonia (2024), which won the Wilbur Smith Adventure Writing Prize.

== Early life ==
Casati was born in Fort Worth, Texas, to Italian parents. Her family returned to northern Italy when she was 2, where she grew up in Brianza near Milan. Casati attended the Liceo Zucchi in Monza. She graduated with a Bachelor of Arts (BA) in English and Film Studies from Queen Mary University of London in 2017 and a Master of Arts (MA) in Writing from the University of Warwick in 2018.

== Career ==
Casati wrote the screenplay for Erminio Perocco's documentary on the painter Tintoretto. Casati also contributed to the Canadian magazine Holr, covering the Venice Film Festival for the publication.

In 2021, Casati published her debut dystopian novel The President Show. That year, she signed her first book deal with Penguin Michael Joseph (PMJ), through which she published the Iliad-inspired novel Clytemnestra in 2023. Clytemnestra became a Sunday Times bestseller, won the Goldsboro Books Glass Bell Award, and was an American Booksellers Association Indie Next pick. It was also shortlisted for the Historical Writers Association (HWA) Debut Crown.

Casati's third fiction novel Babylonia, a work of historical fiction based on the life of Semiramis, was published in 2024. Babylonia became a Sunday Times bestseller and won the Wilbur Smith Adventure Writing Prize in the main Published Novel category.

In 2025, PMJ acquired a historical fantasy duology from Casati, starting with Mythmaker (set to be released in 2027).

== Publications ==
=== Novels ===
- The President Show (2021)
- Clytemnestra (2023)
- Babylonia (2024)

=== Screenwriting ===
- Tintoretto: Il primo regista (2019) (also Tintoretto: L'artista che uccise la pittura)

=== Short stories ===
- "Horrible Feet" (2018) in Nothing in the Rulebook
- "You Asked for It" (2020) in Nothing in the Rulebook

== Awards ==
Year	Award	Category	Title	Result	Ref.
2023	Historical Writers Association (HWA) Crown Awards	Debut Crown	Clytemnestra	Shortlisted	
2023	Goodreads Choice Awards	Fantasy	Clytemnestra	Nominated	
2024	Goldsboro Books Glass Bell Award		Clytemnestra	Won	
2025	Wilbur Smith Adventure Writing Prize	Published Novel	Babylonia	Won	
