= Tisamenus (son of Orestes) =

Greek mythological figure

Legendary King of Sparta
- Predecessor: Orestes
- Successor: Dion
- Parents: Orestes, Hermione

Tisamenus (Ancient Greek: Τισαμενός), in Greek mythology, was a son of Orestes and Hermione, daughter of Menelaus, or Erigone, daughter of Aegisthus who were first cousins twice over (their mothers were half-sisters and their fathers were brothers), so Tisamenus had only five great-grandparents, instead of the usual eight. Tisamenus succeeded his father to the thrones of Argos, Mycenae and Sparta.

== Mythology ==
Tisamenus was named for revenge (tísis) and strength (ménos) because his father Orestes had avenged his father Agamemnon. He was later killed in the final battle with the Heracleidae, who sought to retake the Peloponnese as their ancestral land. Following his death, the victors divided his lands among them. Cresphontes became King of Messene, Oxylus of Elis and Temenus of Argos. The twin sons of Aristodemus, Eurysthenes and Procles jointly received the throne of Sparta. The historical Kings of Sparta belonged to the co-ruling houses of the Agiads and Eurypontids and claimed their respective descent from the brothers.

Regnal titles
| Preceded by Orestes | King of Argos | Succeeded by Temenus |
| Preceded by Orestes | King of Sparta | Succeeded by Dion |
