= Jennifer Saint =

British author

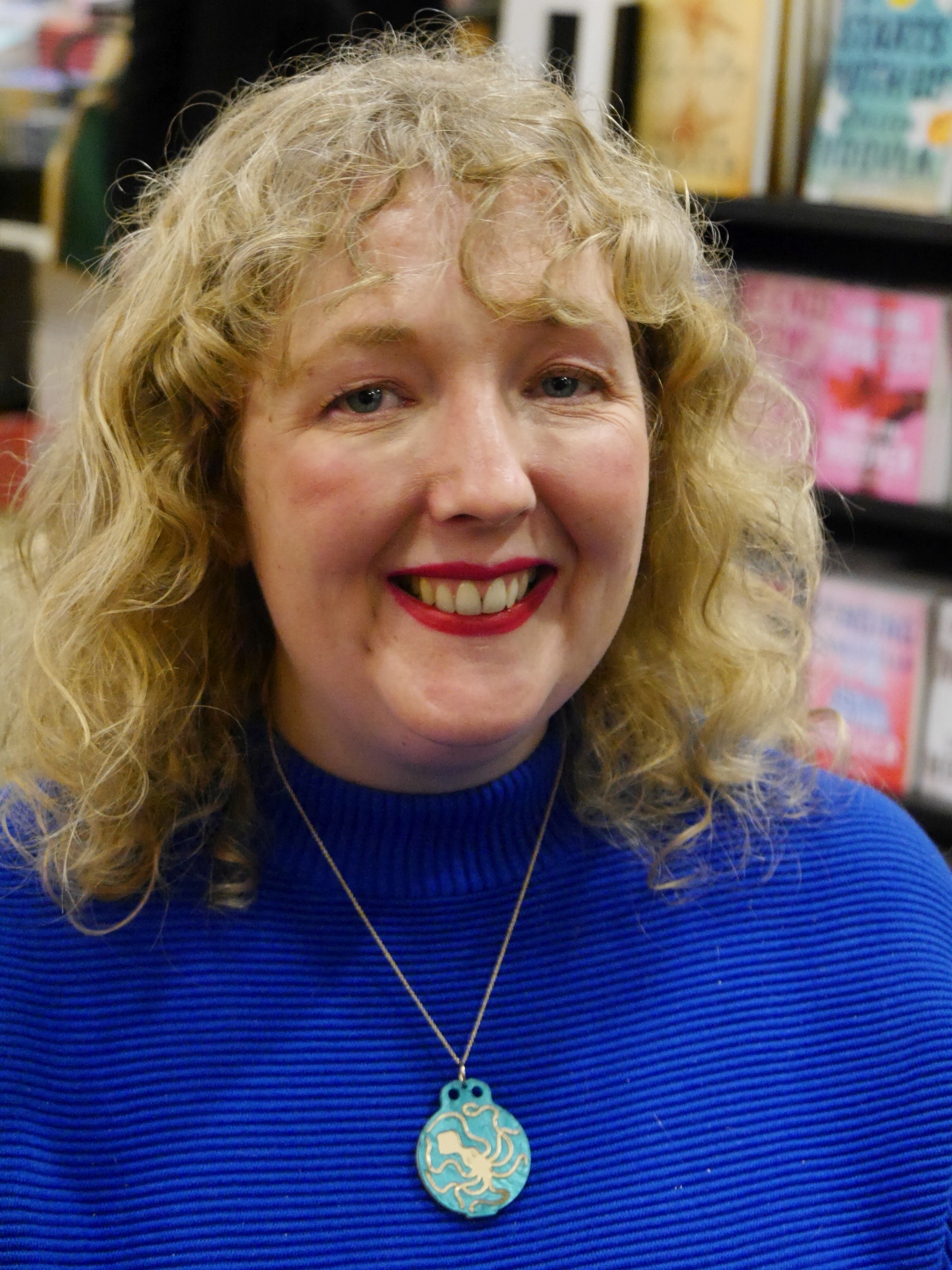
Jennifer Saint, Waterstones, Piccadilly, London, 2022

Jennifer Saint is a British novelist known for retelling the stories of female figures from Greek mythology.

In the Chicago Review of Books, Elektra has "brought fascinating women from Greek myth to life". In Paste, her novel Atalanta was described as "feels like such a breath of fresh air".

== Publications ==
- Ariadne, Wildfire, 2021 ISBN 9781472273901
- Elektra, Wildfire, 2023 ISBN 9781472273956
- Atalanta, Headline, 2023 ISBN 9781472292155
- Hera, Wildfire, 2024 ISBN 9781250855602
- This Immortal Heart, Penguin, 2026 ISBN 9780241734704
