= Helen (mythology) =

Several women in Greek mythology

In Greek mythology, Helen or Helene (Ancient Greek: Ἑλένη, romanized: Helénē; pronounced [helénɛː]) can refer to several people. All but the first are only attested in the works of Ptolemaeus Chennus, a parodoxographer of the second century.

- Helen, commonly known as Helen of Troy, daughter of Zeus and Leda and queen of Sparta as the wife of Menelaus. Her elopement with the Trojan prince Paris sparked the ten year-long Trojan War.
- Helen, daughter of Helen and Paris. Her parents clashed over what name to give her (Paris preferred Alexandra, feminine version of his alternative name Alexander) but in the end Helen prevailed after winning a game of knucklebones. She was killed by her paternal grandmother Hecuba during the sack of Troy.
- Helen, daughter of Clytemnestra (the first Helen's half-sister) and her lover Aegisthus. She was killed by her half-brother Orestes along with her parents.
- Helen, a woman who assisted Aphrodite in her union with Adonis.
- Helen, daughter of the Aetolian Tityrus. She challenged Achilles to single combat and dealt him a near-fatal head injury, but was killed by him in the end.
- Helen, a woman from Epidamnos who distributed silver during a bad famine, and for that reason she received from the people of the town honours worthy of Aphrodite.
- Helen, daughter of Faustulus, the man who fostered Romulus and Remus.
- Helen, a woman who ate three goat kids a day.
- Helen, sister of Dicearchus, son of Telesinos.

== Bibliography ==
- Homer, The Iliad with an English Translation by A.T. Murray, PhD in two volumes. Cambridge, MA., Harvard University Press; London, William Heinemann, Ltd. 1924. Online version at the Perseus Digital Library.
- Photius, Bibliotheca excerpts, sections 1-166 translated by John Henry Freese, from the SPCK edition of 1920, and other brief excerpts from subsequent sections translated by Roger Pearse (from the French translation by René Henry, ed. Les Belles Lettres). Available online on Topos Text.
