= Electra =

Figure from Greek mythology

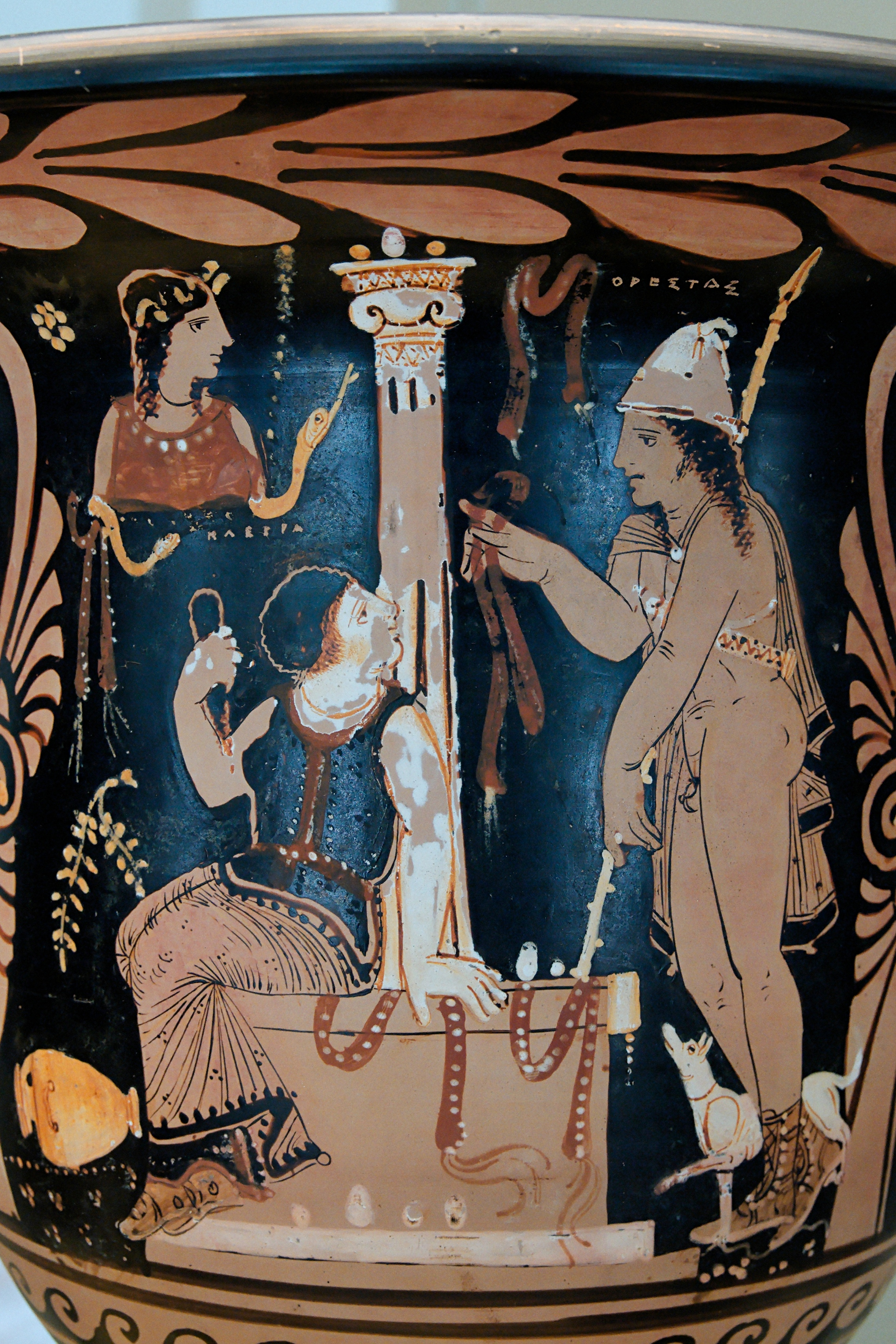
Electra meeting Orestes, c. 340–330 BC

In Greek mythology Electra, also spelt Elektra (/ɪˈlɛktrə/; Ancient Greek: Ἠλέκτρα, romanized: Ēléktra or Ilektra, lit. 'amber', 'shining' or 'radiant', [ɛːléktraː]), is a princess of Mycenae and the daughter of Agamemnon and Clytemnestra. Famously, Electra and her brother, Orestes, attack and kill Clytemnestra to avenge their father's murder.

She is the titular main character of two Greek tragedies: Electra by Sophocles and Electra by Euripides. She is also the central figure in plays by Aeschylus, Alfieri, Voltaire, Hofmannsthal, Eugene O'Neill, and Jean-Paul Sartre. She is a vengeful soul in The Libation Bearers, the second play of Aeschylus' Oresteia trilogy.

In the field of psychology the Electra complex is named after her.

== Family ==
Electra's parents were King Agamemnon and Queen Clytemnestra of Mycenae. Her sisters were Iphigenia and Chrysothemis and her brother was Orestes. In the Iliad Homer is understood to be referring to Electra in mentioning "Laodice" as a daughter of Agamemnon.

== Murder of Agamemnon ==
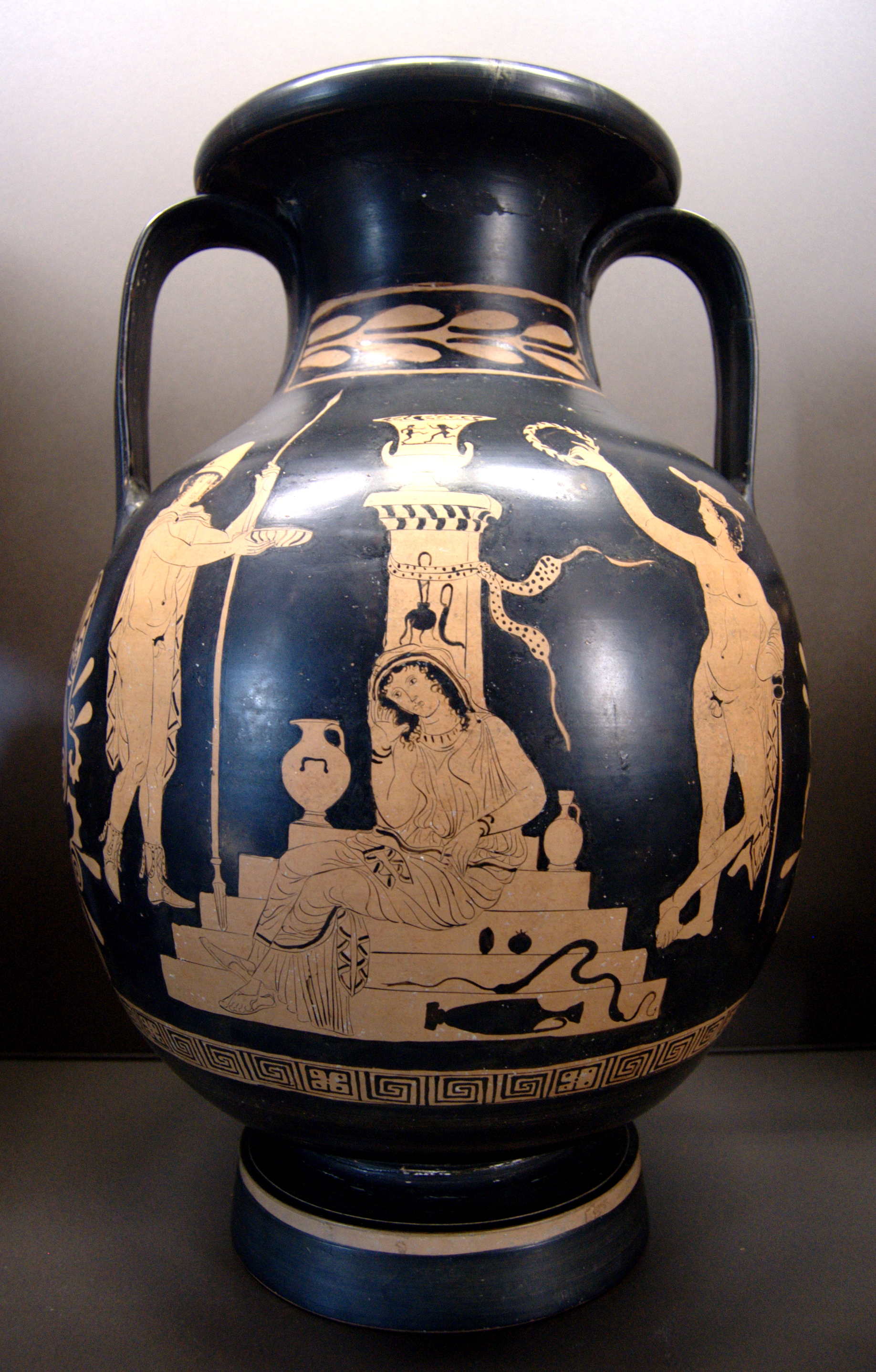
Orestes, Electra and Hermes at the tomb of Agamemnon, lucanian red-figure pelike, c. 380–370 BC, Louvre (K 544)

Electra was absent from Mycenae when her father, King Agamemnon, returned from the Trojan War. When he came back he brought with him his war prize, the Trojan princess Cassandra, who had already borne him twin sons. Upon their arrival Agamemnon and Cassandra were murdered, by either Clytemnestra, her lover Aegisthus, or both. Clytemnestra held righteous resentment for her husband for sacrificing their eldest daughter, Iphigenia, to the goddess Artemis in exchange for a fair wind so that he could set sail for Troy. In some versions of this story Iphigenia was saved by the goddess at the last moment.

Eight years later Electra returned home from Athens at the same time as her brother, Orestes. (Odyssey, iii. 306; X. 542). According to Pindar (Pythia, xi. 25), Orestes was saved either by his old nurse or by Electra from being killed by his mother and was taken to Phanote on Mount Parnassus, where King Strophius took charge of him. When Orestes was twenty, the Oracle of Delphi ordered him to return home and avenge his father's death.

== Murder of Clytemnestra ==
=== Aeschylus ===
In Libation Bearers, a play in the Oresteia trilogy by Athenian playwright Aeschylus, Orestes returns to Argos with his cousin Pylades to exact revenge on his mother. When he goes to perform rites at the tomb of Agamemnon he sees Electra offering libations. Electra is relieved and excited to see him, as she despises Clytemnestra and her living situation. The pair then arrange how Orestes should accomplish the act. Orestes and Pylades first kill Aegisthus, drawing Clytemnestra into the room where she is then ambushed and killed.

In the play Electra is unsure of her own ability to avenge her father, though she is certain in her conviction that revenge is necessary. This version posits that she is a confused participant in the murder of her mother. She turns to her brother to take the role of avenger, uncertain or unwilling to kill Clytemnestra herself.

=== Sophocles ===
Sophocles' Electra is much more imposing than Aeschylus' character. She is consumed by hatred in reaction to her father's death, a far cry from the more reluctant Aeschylus interpretation. Sophocles' Electra is also uncontrollably saddened by her father's murder, which serves only to further her desire for revenge. Furthermore, she is borderline hysterical to avenge her father. This suggests that Electra was more attached to Agamemnon than to Clytemnestra. In this version of events, Electra and Orestes are equal partners in Clytemenestra's murder. Sophocles also presents a more philosophical side of Electra. She confronts her mother about the morality of her actions, where she is presented with a logical defense of the murder by Clytemnestra. Electra rejects this colder view of the death of her father, focusing on the act of murder rather than the circumstances around the event. Electra goes as far as to show complete contempt for Clytemenestra, a unique feature of this interpretation.

=== Euripides ===
Euripides' Electra portrays her as a shrewd yet feeling figure. Unlike the Sophoclean Electra, Euripides' tempers her emotions in order to accomplish her goals throughout the narrative. The act of avenging her father is understood as a necessity, not an emotional endeavor. This colder portrayal of Electra has been interpreted to represent the strength of unmaternal temperaments, as well as an acute understanding between the two female characters of the realities of the gendered world they move within. More divergently, this version of Electra sets the trap that kills Clytemnestra. Orestes is not an equal partner in the murder, with Electra being the ultimate leader of the entire machination. She even feigns maternalism in order to ensnare her mother, though interpretations vary on their relationship up until this point. Some suggest that this final interaction was actually adorned with mutual love and respect, paying homage to both characters' proclivities. However no love is lost between Electra and Clytemnestra. Despite her daughter killing her, Clytemnestra's unmaternal bond holds true. In the same vein Electra harbors no hatred for her mother, unlike in other tellings.

Before her death Clytemnestra cursed Orestes. The Erinyes or Furies, whose duty it is to punish any violation of the ties of family piety, fulfill this curse with their torment. They pursue Orestes, urging him to end his life. Electra is not hounded by the Erinyes.

In Iphigeneia in Tauris Euripides tells the tale somewhat differently. In his version Orestes was led by the Furies to Tauris, on the Black Sea, where his sister Iphigenia was being held. The two met when Orestes and Pylades were brought to Iphigenia to be prepared for sacrifice to Artemis. Iphigeneia, Orestes and Pylades escaped from Tauris. The Furies, appeased by the reunion of the family, abated their persecution. Electra then married Pylades.

== Adaptations of the Electra story ==
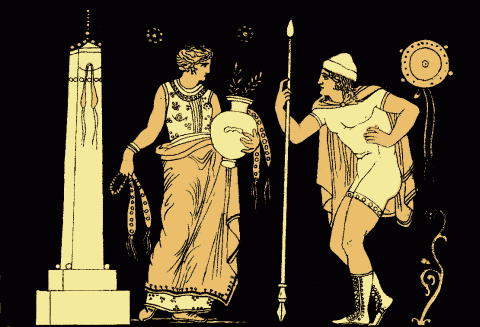
Electra and Orestes, from an 1897 Stories from the Greek Tragedians, by Alfred Church

=== Plays ===
- The Oresteia, a trilogy of plays by Aeschylus
- Electra, play by Sophocles
- Electra, play by Euripides
- Orestes, play by Euripides
- Electra, a lost play by Quintus Tullius Cicero of which nothing is known but the name and that it was "a tragedy in the Greek style"
- Electra (1901) a play by Benito Pérez Galdós
- Elektra, a 1903 play by Hugo von Hofmannsthal, based on the Sophocles play
- Mourning Becomes Electra, 1931 play by Eugene O'Neill, based on Aeschylus
- Electra, 1937 play by Jean Giraudoux
- The Flies, a 1943 play by Jean-Paul Sartre, modernizing the Electra myth by introducing the theme of existentialism
- Electra (started in 1949, first performed 1987), a play by Ezra Pound and Rudd Fleming
- Electra, or The dropping of the masks (1954) a play by Marguerite Yourcenar
- Electra and Orestes, plays by Adrienne Kennedy, 1972
- Electra (1974) a play by Robert Montgomery, directed by Joseph Chaikin
- Electra, 1995 drama by Danilo Kiš
- Electricidad, 2004 play by Luis Alfaro, modern adaptation of Electra based in the Chicano barrio
- Electra/Orestes, 2015 play by Jada Alberts and Anne-Louise Sarks
- Small and Tired, 2017 play by Kit Brookman
- Pitribhumi, 2021 play by Sandarbha
- Electra, 2021 play by Tadashi Suzuki

=== Opera ===
- Elektra, by Richard Strauss, with libretto by Hugo von Hofmannsthal, based on his own play
- Electra, by Mikis Theodorakis
- Mourning Becomes Electra, by Marvin David Levy, based on Eugene O'Neill's play
- Idomeneo, by Wolfgang Amadeus Mozart, where she plays the role of rejected lover/villain
- Electra, opera by Johann Christian Friedrich Haeffner, Libretto by Adolf Fredrik Ristell after Nicolas Francois Guillard
- Électre, tragédie lyrique by Jean-Baptiste Lemoyne, set to a libretto by Nicolas-François Guillard

=== Films ===
- Electra, a film by Michael Cacoyannis, starring Irene Papas, based on Euripides
- Mourning Becomes Electra (film), a film by Dudley Nichols, starring Rosalind Russell and Michael Redgrave
- The Forgotten Pistolero, a Spaghetti Western by Ferdinando Baldi starring Leonard Mann and Luciana Paluzzi
- Ellie, a film which transfers the story to a Southern U.S. locale
- Szerelmem, Elektra (Elektra, My Love), film by Miklós Jancsó, starring Mari Törőcsik
- Filha da Mãe and Mal Nascida, both by Portuguese film director João Canijo
- elektraZenSuite, medium-length film by Alessandro Brucini, based on texts by Aeschylus, Sophocles, William Shakespeare, Hugo von Hofmannsthal, Sylvia Plath, and the Zen Buddhist monk Takuan Soho
- Electra, film by Shyamaprasad, starring Nayanthara, Skanda Ashok, Manisha Koirala and Prakash Raj, based on Euripides

=== Literature ===
- Elektra (Laodice) is the unnamed protagonist and speaker in Yannis Ritsos's long poem Beneath the Shadow of the Mountain. This poem forms part of the cycle colloquially referred to as the New Oresteia.
- Electra is the eponymous narrator of her story in the book 'Electra' by Henry Treece. (Bodley Head, 1963: Sphere Books., 1968).
- Electra on Azalea Path is the title of Sylvia Plath's poem published in 1959, in reference to the Electra Complex
- A central character in Donna Leon's crime fiction series is a present-day young woman named Elettra (the Italian form of "Electra"), who is highly resourceful and who bears some resemblance to the mythological character.
- House of Names, by Colm Tóibín. A retelling of the story of Agamemnon's death and the resulting events. (Simon and Schuster, May 9, 2017. 275 pages)
- Elektra, a novel by Jennifer Saint that tells the parallel story of Elektra's life, along with her mother, Clytemnestra, and Cassandra of Troy
- The Voyage Home by Pat Barker tells the story of Agamemnon's return from Troy and subsequent murder by Clytemnestra, to which Electra is a witness.

== See also ==
- 130 Elektra – asteroid named after Electra.

Bibliography

- Evans, Bergen (1970). Dictionary of Mythology. New York: Dell Publishing. ISBN 0-440-20848-3.
- Vellacott, Philip (1963). Euripides: Medea and Other Plays. London: Penguin Classics. ISBN 0-14-044129-8.
- Fagles, Robert (1977). Aeschylus: The Oresteia. London: Penguin Classics. ISBN 978-0-14-044333-2.
