= Aegisthus =

Figure in Greek mythology

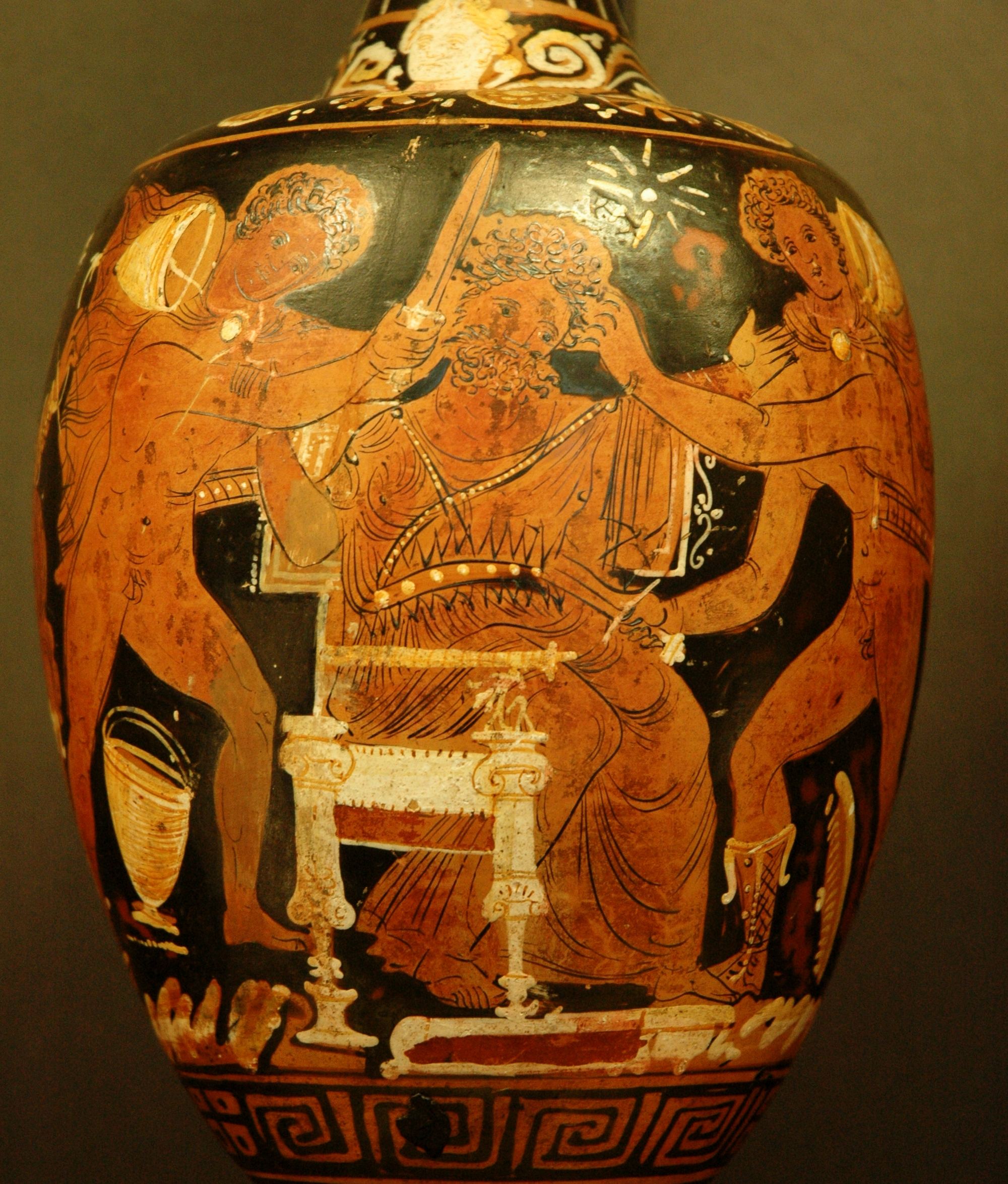
Aegisthus being murdered by Orestes and Pylades – The Louvre

Aegisthus (/iːˈdʒɪsθəs/; Ancient Greek: Αἴγισθος, romanized: Aigisthos, lit. 'goatherd' or 'sustained by a goat'; [ǎi̯ɡistʰos]) was a figure in Greek mythology. Aegisthus is known from two primary sources: the first is Homer's Odyssey, believed to have been first written down by Homer at the end of the 8th century BC, and the second from Aeschylus's Oresteia, written in the 5th century BC. Aegisthus also features heavily in the action of Euripides's Electra (c. 420 BC), although his character remains offstage.

== Family ==
Aegisthus was the son of Thyestes and Thyestes's own daughter Pelopia, an incestuous union motivated by his father's rivalry with the house of Atreus for the throne of Mycenae. Aegisthus murdered Atreus in order to restore his father to power, ruling jointly with him, only to be driven from power by Atreus's son Agamemnon. In another version, Aegisthus was the sole surviving son of Thyestes after Atreus killed his brother's children and served them to Thyestes in a meal.

While Agamemnon laid siege to Troy, his estranged queen Clytemnestra took Aegisthus as a lover. The couple killed Agamemnon upon the king's return, making Aegisthus king of Mycenae once more. Aegisthus ruled for seven more years before his death at the hands of Agamemnon's son Orestes.

== Mythology ==
=== Early life ===
Thyestes felt he had been deprived of the Mycenean throne unfairly by his brother, Atreus. The two battled back and forth several times. In addition, Thyestes had an affair with Atreus's wife, Aerope. In revenge, Atreus killed Thyestes's sons and served them to him unknowingly. After realizing he had eaten his own sons' corpses, Thyestes asked an oracle how best to gain revenge. The advice was to father a son with his own daughter, Pelopia, and that son would kill Atreus.

Thyestes raped Pelopia after she performed a sacrifice, hiding his identity from her. When Aegisthus was born, his mother abandoned him, ashamed of his origin, and he was raised by shepherds and suckled by a goat, hence his name Aegisthus (from αἴξ, male goat). Atreus, not knowing the baby's origin, took Aegisthus in and raised him as his own son.

=== Death of Atreus ===
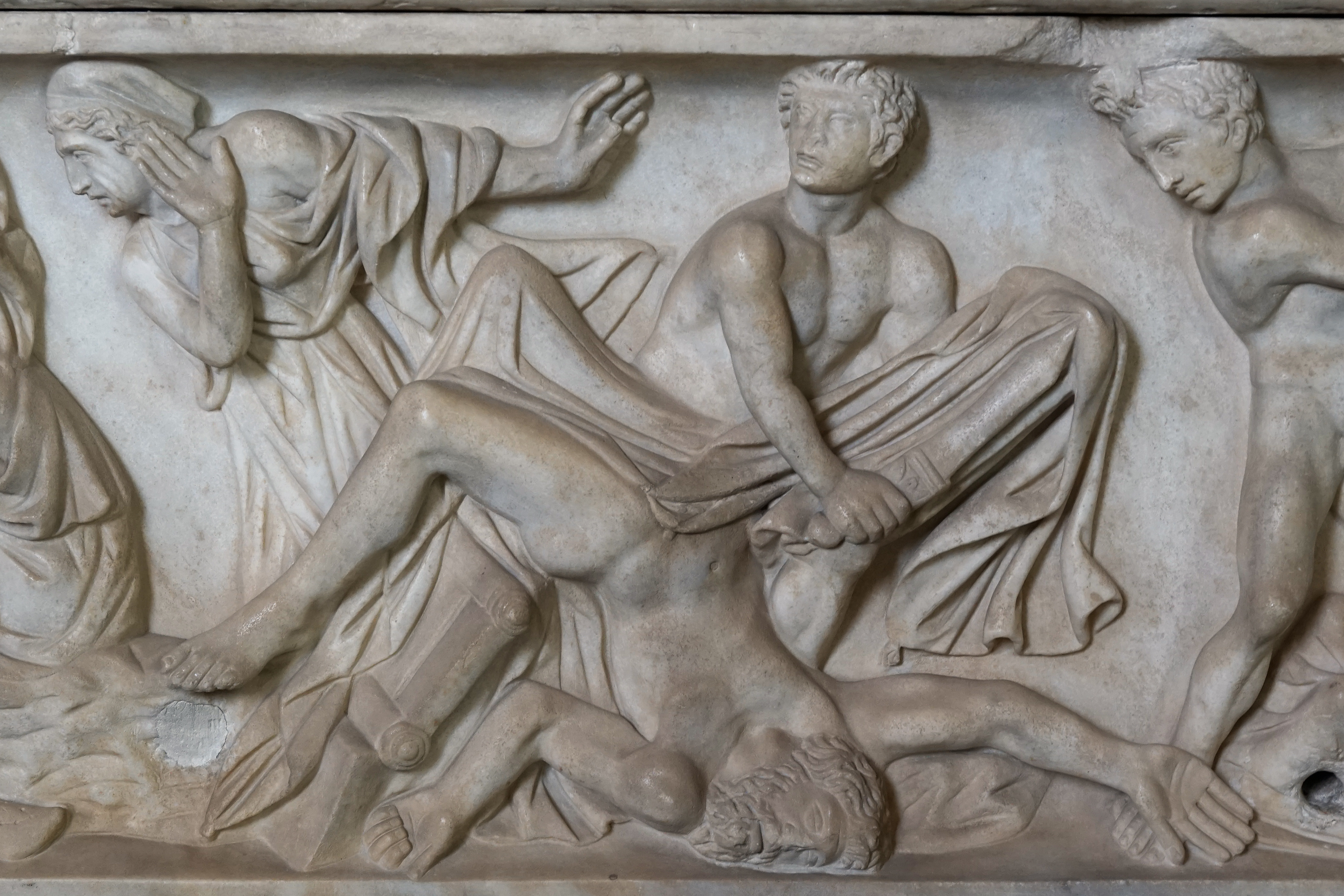
Orestes kills Aegisthus on a second-century Roman sarcophagus, Pio Clementino Museum.

In the night in which Pelopia had been raped by her father, she had taken from him his sword which she afterwards gave to Aegisthus. When she discovered that the sword belonged to her own father, she realised that her son was the product of incestuous rape. In despair, she killed herself. Atreus in his enmity towards his brother sent Aegisthus to kill him; but the sword which Aegisthus carried was the cause of the recognition between Thyestes and his son, and the latter returned and slew his uncle Atreus, while he was offering a sacrifice on the seacoast. Aegisthus and his father now took possession of their lawful inheritance from which they had been expelled by Atreus.

=== Power struggle over Mycenae ===
Aegisthus and Thyestes thereafter ruled over Mycenae jointly, exiling Atreus's sons Agamemnon and Menelaus to Sparta, where King Tyndareus gave the pair his daughters, Clytemnestra and Helen, to take as wives. Agamemnon and Clytemnestra had four children: one son, Orestes, and three daughters, Iphigenia, Electra, and Chrysothemis.

After the death of Tyndareus, Meneleaus became king of Sparta. He used the Spartan army to drive out Aegisthus and Thyestes from Mycenae and place Agamemnon on the throne. Agamemnon extended his dominion by conquest and became the most powerful ruler in Greece. After Helen's abduction to Troy, Agamemnon was forced to sacrifice his own daughter Iphigenia in order to appease the gods before setting off for Ilium. While Agamemnon was away fighting in the Trojan War, Clytemnestra turned against her husband and took Aegisthus as a lover. Upon Agamemnon's return to Mycenae, Aegisthus and Clytemnestra worked together to kill Agamemnon with certain accounts recording Aegisthus committing the murder while others record Clytemnestra herself exacting revenge on Agamemnon for his murder of Iphigenia.

Following Agamemnon's death, Aegisthus reigned over Mycenae for seven years. He and Clytemnestra had a son, Aletes, and a two daughters, Erigone and Helen. In the eighth year of his reign Orestes, the son of Agamemnon, returned to Mycenae and avenged the death of his father by killing Aegisthus and Clytemnestra. The impiety of matricide was such that Orestes was forced to flee from Mycenae, pursued by the Furies. Aletes became king until Orestes returned several years later and killed him. Orestes later married Aegisthus's daughter Erigone.

== In culture ==
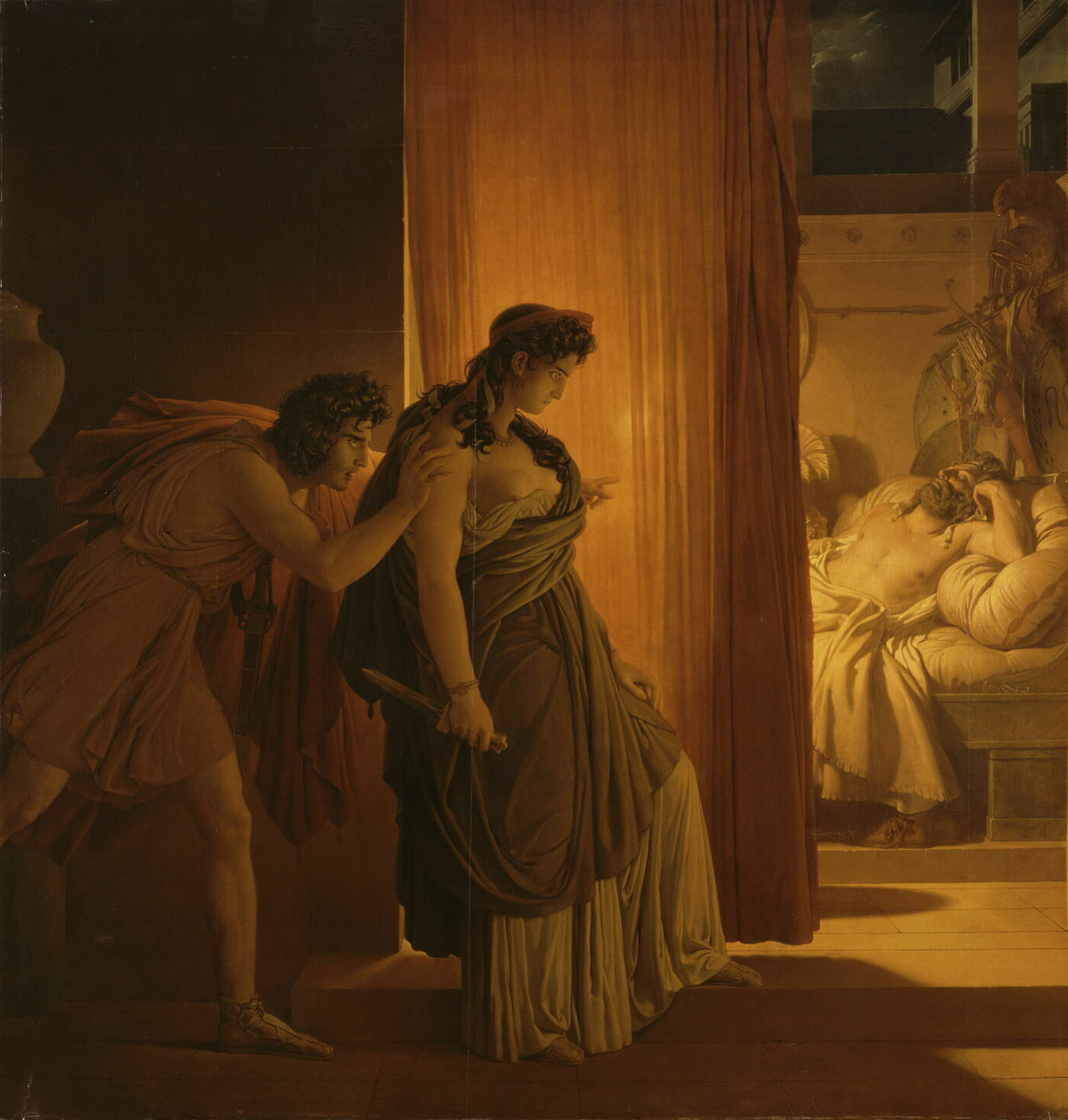
Pierre-Narcisse Guérin's Clytemnestra and Agamemnon, in which Aegisthus appears as a shadowy figure pushing Clytemnestra forward

Homer gives no information about Aegisthus's antecedents. We learn from him only that, after the death of Thyestes, Aegisthus ruled as king at Mycenae and took no part in the Trojan expedition. While Agamemnon was absent on his expedition against Troy, Aegisthus seduced Clytemnestra, and was so wicked as to offer up thanks to the gods for the success with which his criminal exertions were crowned. In order not to be surprised by the return of Agamemnon, he sent out spies, and when Agamemnon came, Aegisthus invited him to a repast at which he had him treacherously murdered.

In Aeschylus's Oresteia, Aegisthus is a minor figure. In the first play, Agamemnon, he appears at the end to claim the throne, after Clytemnestra herself has killed Agamemnon and Cassandra. Clytemnestra wields the axe she has used to quell dissent. In The Libation Bearers he is killed quickly by Orestes, who then struggles over having to kill his mother. Aegisthus is referred to as a "weak lion", plotting the murders but having his lover commit the deeds. According to Johanna Leah Braff, he "takes the traditional female role, as one who devises but is passive and does not act." Christopher Collard describes him as the foil to Clytemnestra, his brief speech in Agamemnon revealing him to be "cowardly, sly, weak, full of noisy threats - a typical 'tyrant figure' in embryo."

Aeschylus's portrayal of Aegisthus as a weak, implicitly feminised figure, influenced later writers and artists who often depict him as an effeminate or decadent individual, either manipulating or dominated by the more powerful Clytemnestra. He appears in Seneca's Agamemnon, enticing her to murder. In Richard Strauss's and Hugo von Hofmannsthal's opera, Elektra his voice is "a decidedly high-pitched tenor, punctuated by irrational upward leaps, that rises to high pitched squeals during his death colloquy with Elektra." In the first production he was depicted as "an epicene...with long curly locks and rouged lips, half-cringing, half-posturing seductively."

An ancient tomb in Mycenae is fancifully known as the "Tomb of Aegisthus". It dates from around 1510 BC.
