= Troades (Seneca) =

Tragedy by Seneca

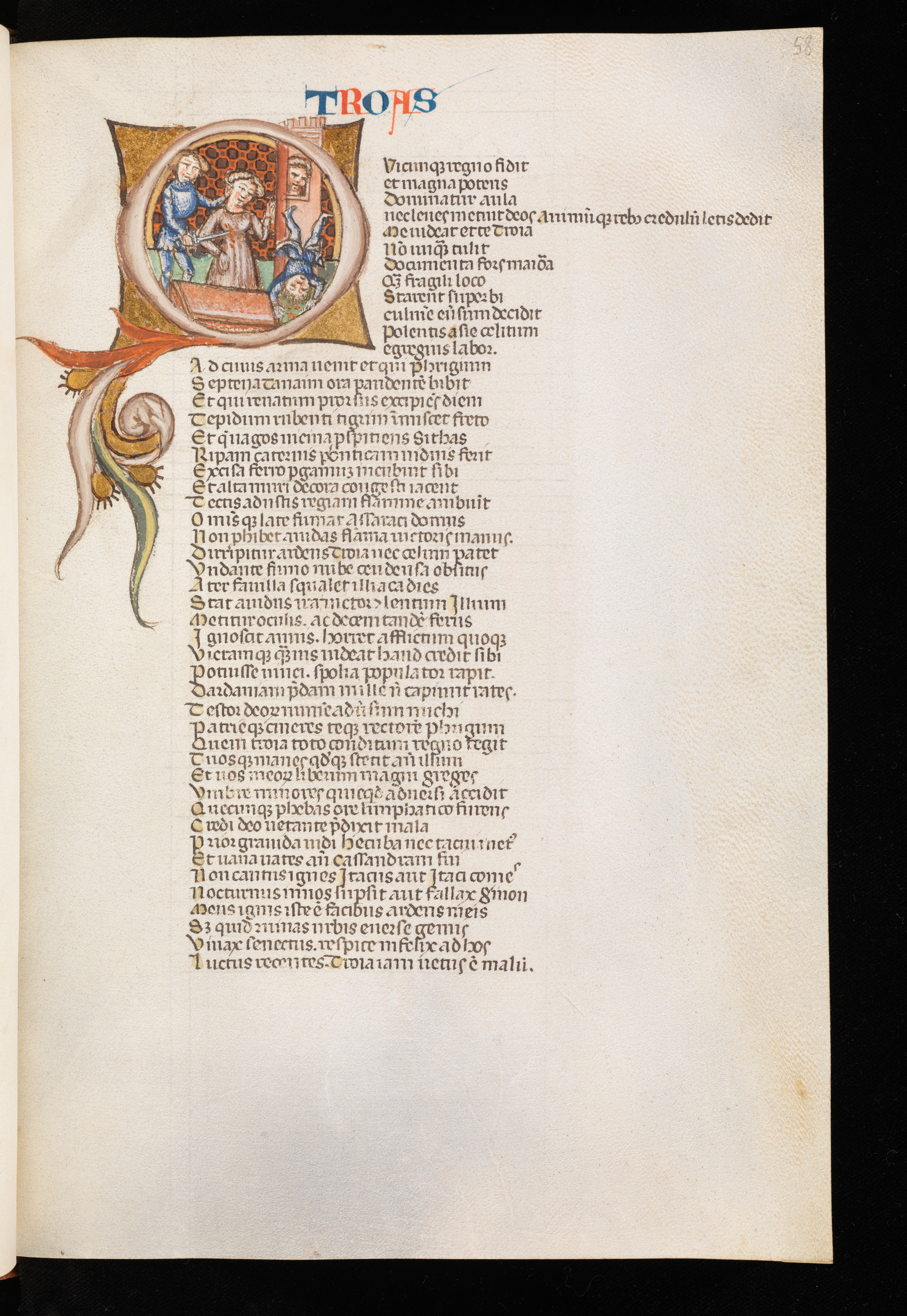
- First page of Troades from a 15th-century Italian manuscript
- Author: Lucius Annaeus Seneca
- Language: Latin
- Genre: Tragedy
- Set in: Troy
- Publication date: mid to late 1st century
- Publication place: Rome
- Text: Troades at Wikisource

Troades (from Greek Τρωάδες, The Trojan Women; also called Troas) is a fabula crepidata (Roman tragedy with Greek subject) of c. 1179 lines of verse written by Lucius Annaeus Seneca.

== Characters ==
- Hecuba, queen of Troy, widow of Priam
- Chorus of Trojans
- Talthybius, Greek herald
- Agamemnon, Greek king
- Calchas, Greek seer
- Helena, "Helen of Troy"
- Pyrrhus, son of Achilles
- Andromache, widow of Hector
- senex (old man)
- Ulysses, Greek hero
- Astyanax, son of Andromache and Hector
- nuntius (messenger)
- Polyxena, daughter of Hecuba and Priam (silent role)

== Plot ==
The siege of Troy is done and the city is now smouldering ruins. The victorious Greeks have gathered the rich spoils of Troy upon the shore, among these the Trojan women who await their lot to be assigned to their Greek lords and taken to the cities of their foes. But now the ghost of Achilles has risen from the tomb, and demanded that Polyxena be sacrificed to him before the Greeks shall be allowed to sail away. And Calchas, also, bids that Astyanax be slain, for only then can Greece be safe from any future Trojan war.

=== Act I ===
Hecuba laments with the Chorus of Trojans the destruction of their country and the death of Hector and Priam.

=== Act II ===
Talthybius relates that the Ghost of Achilles has appeared, and reproving the Greeks for their ingratitude, demanded that Polyxena, under the pretext of marriage with whom, he was slain, should be sacrificed at his tomb as an offering to the chthonic gods. Otherwise the Greeks will not have a favourable wind for their return.

Agamemnon and Pyrrhus quarrel about the sacrifice. Calchas is summoned and he asserts that not only must Polyxena be slain, but Astyanax must also be hurled from the tower.

The Chorus denies that Achilles appeared as a spirit, and asserts that the soul dies forever with the body.

=== Act III ===
Andromache having taken alarm at a vision in her dream, hides away her son in his father's tomb. Ulysses in his cleverness discovers where he is, and drags him forth to meet his death.

Andromache mingles curses and threats with her supplications entreating Ulysses, but not prevailing upon him. The Trojans, once allotted to the Greeks, are to be conveyed to various parts of Greece—some to Sparta, some to Mycenae, some to Ithaca, and to the country of Helen, Agamemnon and Ulysses.

=== Act IV ===
The plan is discussed as to how the sacrifices to the chthonic gods and manes of Achilles are to be conducted; and in what garments, Polyxena, who is to be sacrificed under the impression of a real marriage, is to be arrayed. Also what part shall be played by Helen, in order that she may cajole Polyxena with the vain hope of marrying Pyrrhus: she at first, keeps up the pretence, but after a time dismisses the deception, having argued with Andromache, she confesses everything and openly recommends the fulfilment of the scheme.

The Chorus derives consolation from the misfortune being shared by so many; "as if for the wretched to have companions in sorrow were a solace," and then draws attention to the fact that the solace in question will lose its efficacy, as they will be separated by the allotting that has been going on.

=== Act V ===
The Messenger informs the mothers, Hecuba and Andromache, that Astyanax has been hurled from the tower and Polyxena slain at the tomb of Achilles.

== Reception ==
Translator R. Scott Smith wrote that Seneca's attempt in the work to weave two episodes together "means that the play is somewhat dissociated – a 'flaw' that critics have sometimes brought to bear against it", but stated that "in the place of unity, however, there is symmetry."
