= Andromache and Pyrrhus =

Painting by Pierre-Narcisse Guérin

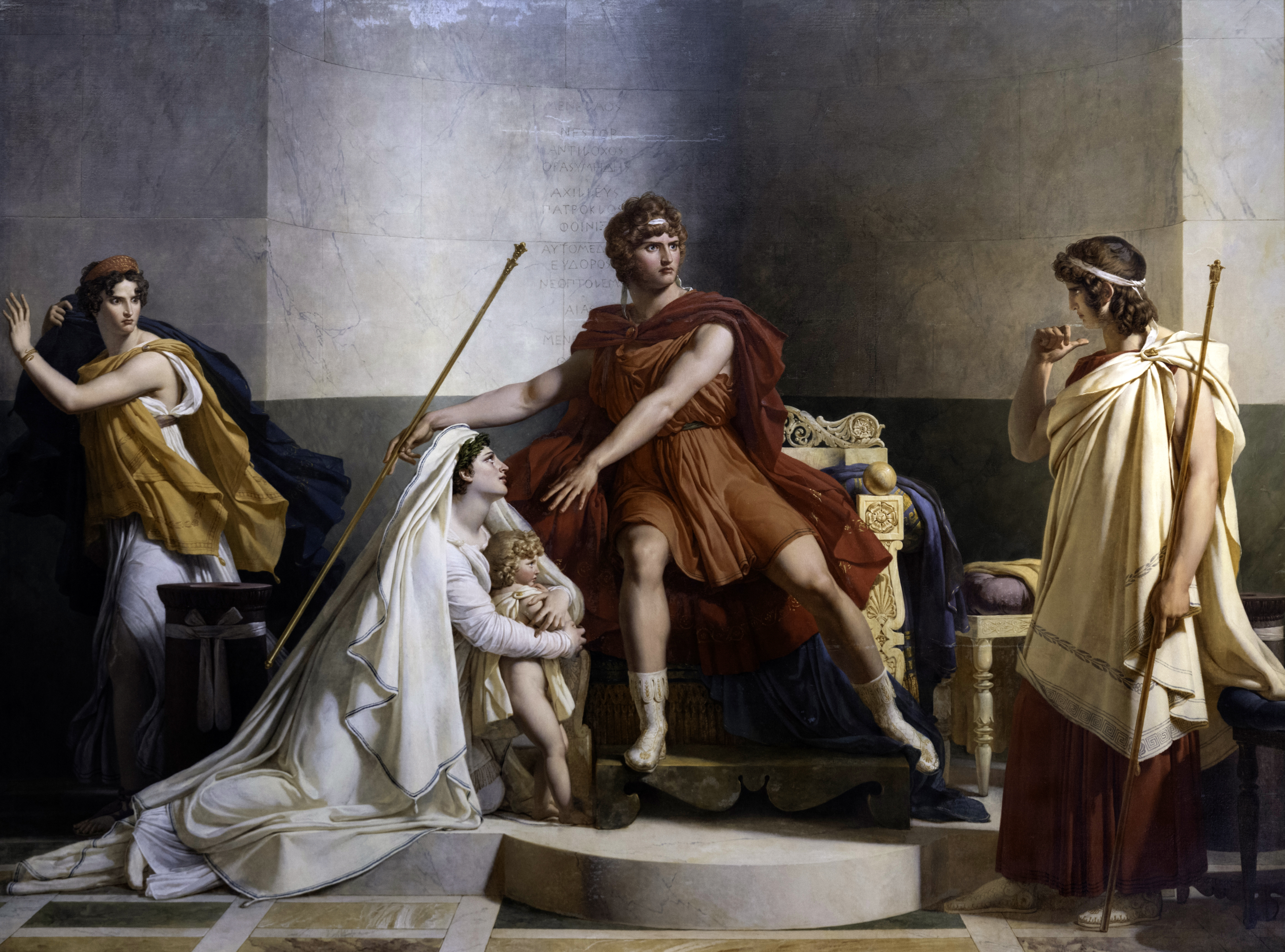
- Artist: Pierre-Narcisse Guérin
- Year: 1810
- Type: Oil on canvas, history painting
- Dimensions: 342 cm × 457 cm (135 in × 180 in)
- Location: Louvre, Paris

Andromache and Pyrrhus (French: Andromaque et Pyrrhus) is an oil on canvas neoclassical history painting by the French artist Pierre-Narcisse Guérin, from 1810. It is held in the Louvre, in Paris.

== History and description ==
The canvas includes two scene's taken from Jean Racine's 1677 tragedy Andromaque, in one composition. It portrays Pyrrhus, seated on a throne and receiving a message delivered by Orestes demanding the death of Astyanax. Andromache wraps her arms protectively round the young Astyanax. Pyrrhus, seated, extends his hand and scepter to Andromache who is on her knees and weeping, and places her under his protection. On the left, Hermione, jealous of her rival's power, walks away in anger. Pyrrhus falls in love with his prisoner Andromache, widow of the Trojan hero Hector, killed by Achilles, but he intends, in principle, to marry Hermione, daughter of Menelaus, king of Sparta. As for Orestes, he passionately loves Hermione. The background of the scene is very plain with the names of the combatants of the Trojan War are written in Greek including that of Pyrrhus (as Neoptolemus). Pyrrhus is seated in a throne and dressed regally in red, while Andromache is fully dressed in white, traditionally the colour of innocence.

== Provenance ==
The painting was exhibited at the Salon of 1810 and the Salon of 1814. It was acquired by Louis XVIII, in 1822, for the collection of the Louvre.

== Bibliography ==
- Eitner, Lorenz. An Outline Of 19th Century European Painting: From David Through Cezanne. Routledge, 2021.
- Roisman, Hanna M. Euripides: Andromache. Bloomsbury Publishing, 2024.
