= Andromache (play) =

Ancient Greek tragedy by Euripides

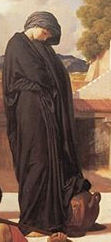
- Captive Andromache (detail) by Frederic Leighton
- Original language: Ancient Greek
- Written by: Euripides
- Chorus: Women of Phthia
- Characters: Andromache; Maid; Hermione; Menelaus; Molossus; Peleus; Nurse of Hermione; Orestes; Messenger; Thetis
- Subject: Andromache's life as a slave
- Genre: Athenian tragedy
- Setting: Phthia in Thessaly (northern Greece) before the temple of Thetis.

Andromache (Ancient Greek: Ἀνδρομάχη) is an Athenian tragedy by Euripides. It dramatises Andromache's life as a slave, years after the events of the Trojan War, and her conflict with her master's new wife, Hermione. The date of its first performance is unknown. Some scholars place the date sometime between 428 and 425 BC. Müller places it between 420 and 417 BC. A Byzantine scholion to the play suggests that its first production was staged outside Athens, though modern scholarship regards this claim as dubious.

== Background ==
During the Trojan War, Achilles killed Andromache's husband Hector. Homer in the Iliad describes Andromache's lament, after Hector's death, that their young son Astyanax will suffer poverty growing up without a father. Instead, the conquering Greeks threw Astyanax to his death from the Trojan walls, for fear that he would grow up to avenge his father and city. Andromache was made a slave of Achilles' son Neoptolemus.

Years pass and Andromache has a child with Neoptolemus. Neoptolemus weds Hermione, daughter of Menelaus and Helen. Even though Andromache is still devoted to her dead husband Hector, Hermione is deeply jealous and plots her revenge. Fearing for her life and the life of her child, Andromache hides the child and seeks refuge in the temple of Thetis (who was the mother of Achilles).

== Characters ==
- Andromache – Hector's widow, now Neoptolemus' Trojan slave
- Maid of Andromache
- Chorus of Phthian women
- Hermione – daughter of Menelaus, wife of Neoptolemus
- Menelaus – king of Sparta
- Molossus – son of Andromache and Neoptolemus
- Peleus – king of Phthia, grandfather of Neoptolemus
- Nurse of Hermione
- Orestes – Hermione's cousin
- Messenger
- Thetis – goddess, wife of Peleus

== Plot synopsis ==
Clinging to the altar of the sea-goddess Thetis for sanctuary, Andromache delivers the play's prologue, in which she mourns her misfortune (the destruction of Troy, the deaths of her husband Hector and their child Astyanax, and her enslavement to Neoptolemos) and her persecution at the hands of Neoptolemos' new wife Hermione and her father Menelaus, King of Sparta. She reveals that Neoptolemos has left for the oracle at Delphi and that she has hidden the son she had with him, Molossos, for fear that Menelaus will try to kill him as well as her.

A Maid arrives to warn her that Menelaus knows the location of her son and is on his way to capture him. Andromache persuades her to risk seeking the help of the king, Peleus (husband of Thetis, Achilles' father, and Neoptolemos' grandfather). Andromache laments her misfortunes again and weeps at the feet of the statue of Thetis. The párodos of the chorus follows, in which they express their desire to help Andromache and try to persuade her to leave the sanctuary. Just at the moment that they express their fearfulness of discovery by Hermione, she arrives, boasting of her wealth, status, and liberty.

Hermione engages in an extended agôn with Andromache, in which they exchange a long rhetorical speech initially, each accusing the other. Hermione accuses Andromache of practising oriental witchcraft to make her barren and attempting to turn her husband against her and to displace her. "Learn your new-found place," she demands. She condemns the Trojans as barbarians who practise incest and polygamy. Their agon continues in a series of rapid stichomythic exchanges.

When Menelaus arrives and reveals that he has found her son, Andromache allows herself to be led away. The intervention of the aged Peleus (the grandfather of Neoptolemus) saves them. Orestes, who has contrived the murder of Neoptolemus at Delphi and who arrives unexpectedly, carries off Hermione, to whom he had been betrothed before Neoptolemus had claimed her. The murder of Neoptolemus by Orestes and men of Delphi is described in detail by the Messenger to Peleus. The goddess Thetis appears as a deus ex machina and divines the future for Neoptolemus' corpse, Peleus, Andromache and Molossus: Neoptolemus is to be buried in Delphi as a reminder of Orestes' crime; Andromache will be brought to Helenus to marry him; Molossus will go with his mother and become first in a line of kings; Peleus will join Thetis in the palace of Nereus as an immortal.

== Context ==
The odious character which Euripides attributes to Menelaus has been seen as according with the feeling against Sparta that prevailed at the time at Athens. He is portrayed as an arrogant tyrant and a physical coward, and his daughter Hermione is portrayed as excessively concerned with her husband's faithfulness, and capable of plotting to kill an innocent child (of Andromache) in order to clear the household of rival sons for the throne; she is also portrayed as wealthy, with her own money, and this is said by some of the characters (notably Andromache and Peleus) to make her high-handed. Peleus curses Sparta several times during the play.

== Reception ==
Andromache is largely seen as unpopular due to it being staged between more well-regarded plays, such as Medea and Hippolytus, and more controversial ones, such as Electra and Herakles.

In his Classical Weekly review, Van Johnson praises the dichotomy between Andromache and Hermione and Orestes and Neoptolemus. What Johnson sees as surprising, given the ancient Athenian view towards women, is that Andromache's female characters are its most developed. Similarly, the play's heroes are often those that suffer the most. Andromache and Molossus, though they survive Menelaus' attempts on their lives, are still enslaved by the narrative's end. There is also Peleus, who, in standing against Menelaus, is rewarded for his efforts with the murder of Neoptolemus, his only mortal relative, by his enemy's nephew, Orestes. In the end, Johnson views Euripides as having created a worthy sequel to Homer.

On the contrary, Nancy Rabinowitz recounts the apparent disconnect between Andromache's three plot lines, the Andromache-Neoptolemus-Hermione triangle, the Peleus-Menelaus conflict, and the Neoptolemus-Hermione-Orestes triangle. In regards to the Andromache-Neoptolemus-Hermione triangle, she also notes that, with time, the boundary between the "good" and "bad" woman has blurred. In Euripides' time, Andromache's lack of interest and/or engagement in said triangle would have been praised while Hermione's jealousy towards the slave marks her as petty and childish. To a modern audience, the unequal roles of husband and wife is more apparent. Neoptolemus is allowed to have both women, while they are only allowed the one man, either as husband or as master.

== Translations ==
- Robert Potter, 1783 - verse: full text
- Edward P. Coleridge, 1891 – prose, full text at "Andromache". The Internet Classics Archive. 1994.
- Arthur S. Way, 1912 – verse
- Moses Hadas and John McLean, 1936 - prose
- Hugh O. Meredith, 1937 – verse
- Van L. Johnson, 1955 – prose
- John Frederick Nims, 1956 – verse: available for digital loan
- David Kovacs, 1987 – prose, full text at "Andromache". Perseus Digital Library. 1994.
- James Morwood, 1997 – prose
- Robert Cannon, 1997 – verse
- Susan Stewart and Wesley D. Smith, 2001 - verse
- George Theodoridis, 2001 – prose, full text at "Andromache". Bacchicstage – The Ancient Greek Stage. 2001.
- Bruce Vandeventer, 2012 – verse
- Brian Vinero, 2021: rhymed verse

== Sources ==
- Cannon, Robert, trans. 1997. Andromache. In Plays: V. By Euripides. Ed. J. Michael Walton. Classical Greek Dramatists ser. London: Methuen. 1–62. ISBN 0-413-71640-6.
- Ley, Graham. 2007. The Theatricality of Greek Tragedy: Playing Space and Chorus. Chicago and London: U of Chicago P. ISBN 0-226-47757-6.
- Walton, J. Michael. 1997. Introduction. In Plays: V. By Euripides. Ed. J. Michael Walton. Classical Greek Dramatists ser. London: Methuen. vii–xxiii. ISBN 0-413-71640-6.
