= Helenus (son of Priam) =

Mythical Trojan prince and seer

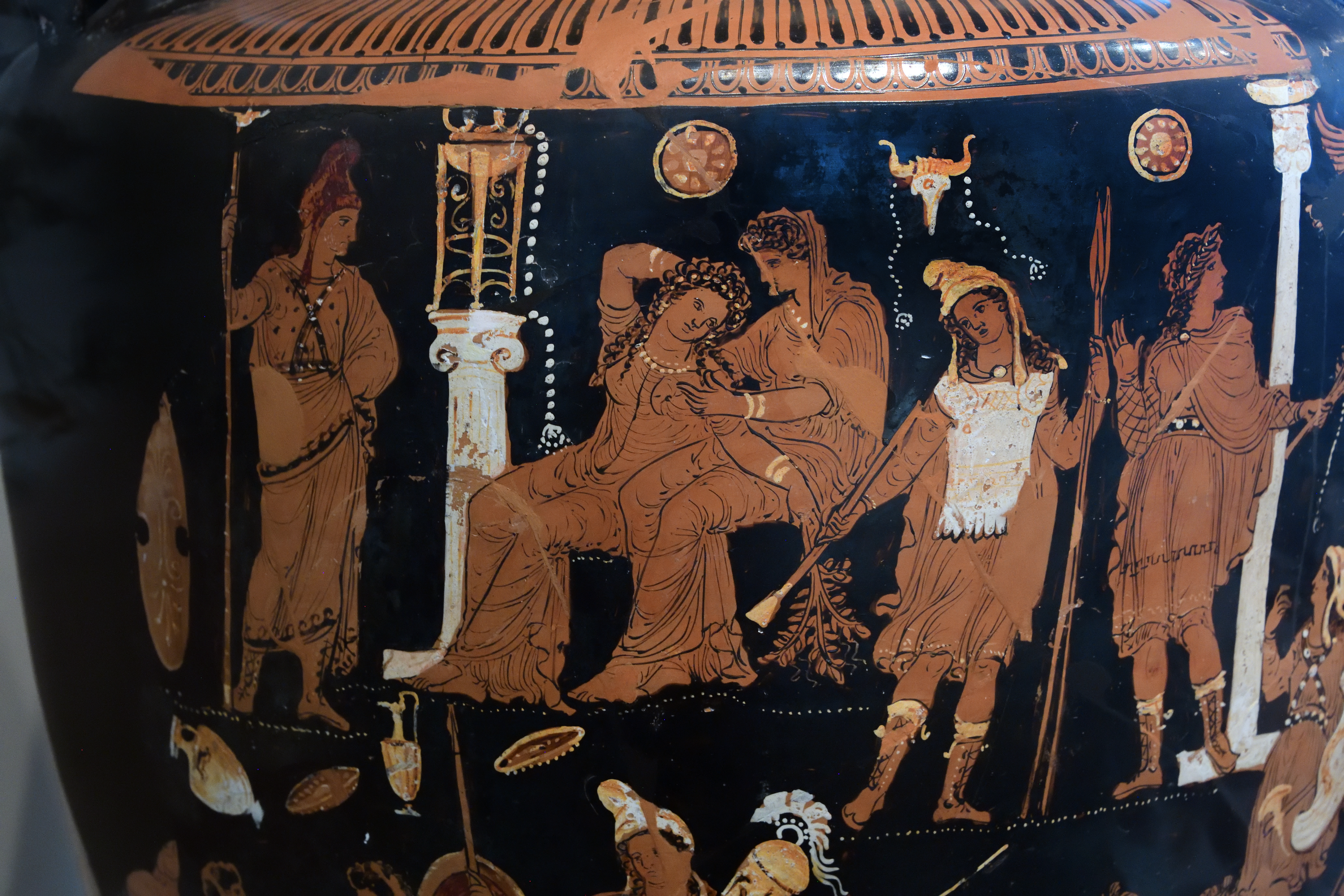
Hecuba comforts Cassandra, the male figure at the far right is apparently Helenus, interpreting the same omen as Cassandra.

In Greek mythology, Helenus (/ˈhɛlənəs/; Ancient Greek: Ἕλενος, romanized: Hélenos, lit. 'bright', 'shining light' or 'torch') was a gentle and clever seer. He was also a Trojan prince as the son of King Priam and Queen Hecuba of Troy, and the twin brother of the prophetess Cassandra.

== Mythology ==
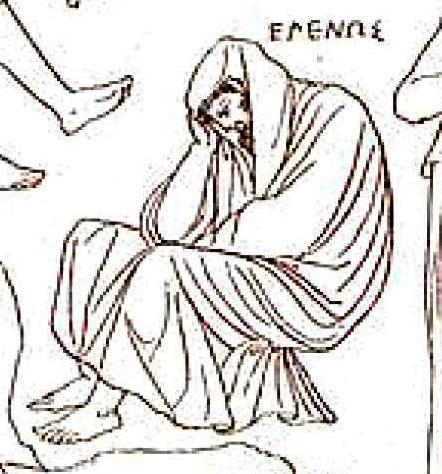
Sketch Illustration of Helenus

=== Early years ===
In the earliest sources, Helenus and his sister Cassandra were given the power of prophecy by Apollo after their ears were licked by snakes. In other sources, Helenus was taught the power by Cassandra, but others generally believed his predictions. After gaining foresight, he was renamed from Scamandrius to Helenus by a Thracian soothsayer. Helenus predicted that if Alexander (Paris) brought home a Greek wife (i.e. Helen), the Achaeans would pursue, and overpower Troy and slay his parents and brothers.

=== Trojan War ===
Helenus is described by Homer as being the greatest of augurs. He advises Hector to challenge any Achaean to a duel, which Telemonian Ajax accepts. Helenus led the third battalion of the Trojan forces along with his brother Deiphobus. He was also part of the Trojan forces led by his brother Hector that beat the Greeks back from the plains west of Troy, and attacked their camp in the Iliad. After killing Deipyrus, he is wounded in the hand by Menelaus and forced to retreat.

In the final year of the Trojan War, Helenus vied against his brother Deiphobus for the hand of Helen after the death of their brother Paris, but Helen was awarded to Deiphobus. Disgruntled over his loss, Helenus retreated to Mount Ida, where Odysseus later captured him. He tells Odysseus, perhaps after torture or coercion, how to capture Troy: they would win if they stole the Trojan Palladium, brought the bones of Pelops to Troy, and persuaded Neoptolemus (Achilles' son by the Scyrian princess Deidamia) and Philoctetes (who possessed Heracles' bow and arrows) to join the Greeks in the war. Neoptolemus was hiding from the war at Scyrus, but the Greeks retrieved him.

=== Aftermath ===
Neoptolemus had taken Andromache, Helenus's sister-in-law and Hector's widow, as a slave and concubine after the fall of Troy, and fathered Molossus, Pielus and Pergamus with her. After the fall of Troy, Helenus went with Neoptolemus, according to Apollodorus' Epitome 6.13. He traveled with Neoptolemus, Andromache and their children to Epirus, where Neoptolemus permitted him to found the city of Buthrotum. After Neoptolemus left Epirus, he left Andromache and their sons in Helenus's care.

Neoptolemus was killed by Orestes, Agamemmon's son, in a dispute over Hermione, the daughter of Menelaus and Helen, whom Orestes had been promised as wife, but whom Neoptolemus had taken. As the kingdom of Neoptolemus was partitioned, this led to Helenus acquiring the rule of Buthrotum, as king. "Helenus, a son of Priam, was king over these Greek cities of Epirus, having succeeded to the throne and bed of Neoptolemus."

Andromache bore him a son, Cestrinus, who is identified with Genger or Zenter, a legendary Trojan king and father of Francus. Some mythographers alleged that Helenus was given the hand of both Deidamia and Andromache in marriage, which helped consolidate his claims to Neoptolemus' kingdom. Helenus prophesied Aeneas' founding of Rome when he and his followers stopped at Buthrotum, detailed by Virgil in Aeneid Book III.

=== Other myths ===
In one account, Helenus got his mother Hecuba after the Trojan War and they crossed over to the Chersonese where the queen was turned into a dog. Helenus then buried her at the place now called the Dog's Tomb.

In one version of the myth, Agamemnon summoned all of the traitors who helped betray Troy and honored their promises to them after the sack of the Troy. Two of which were Helenus and Cassandra who had always pled with Priam for peace, and how Helenus had successfully urged the return of Achilles' body for burial. Accordingly, Agamemnon, following the advice of the council, gave Helenus and Cassandra their freedom. Then Helenus, remembering how Hecuba and Andromache had always loved him, interceded with Agamemnon in their behalf. The latter by advice of the council gave these their freedom. It is said that these four migrated to the Thracian Chersonese where they settled with twelve hundred followers.

In Geoffrey of Monmouth's Historia Regum Britanniae (c. 1136) Helenus was captured by Neoptolemus along with many other Trojans, and taken in chains to Greece as revenge for the death of Achilles in the Trojan War. Under Neoptolemus' orders, they and their descendants remained in slavery until the time of King Pandrasus several generations later, when they were liberated by Brutus of Troy.

== See also ==
- List of children of Priam
- The Golden Bough (mythology)
