= Pandrasus =

Fictional king of Greece

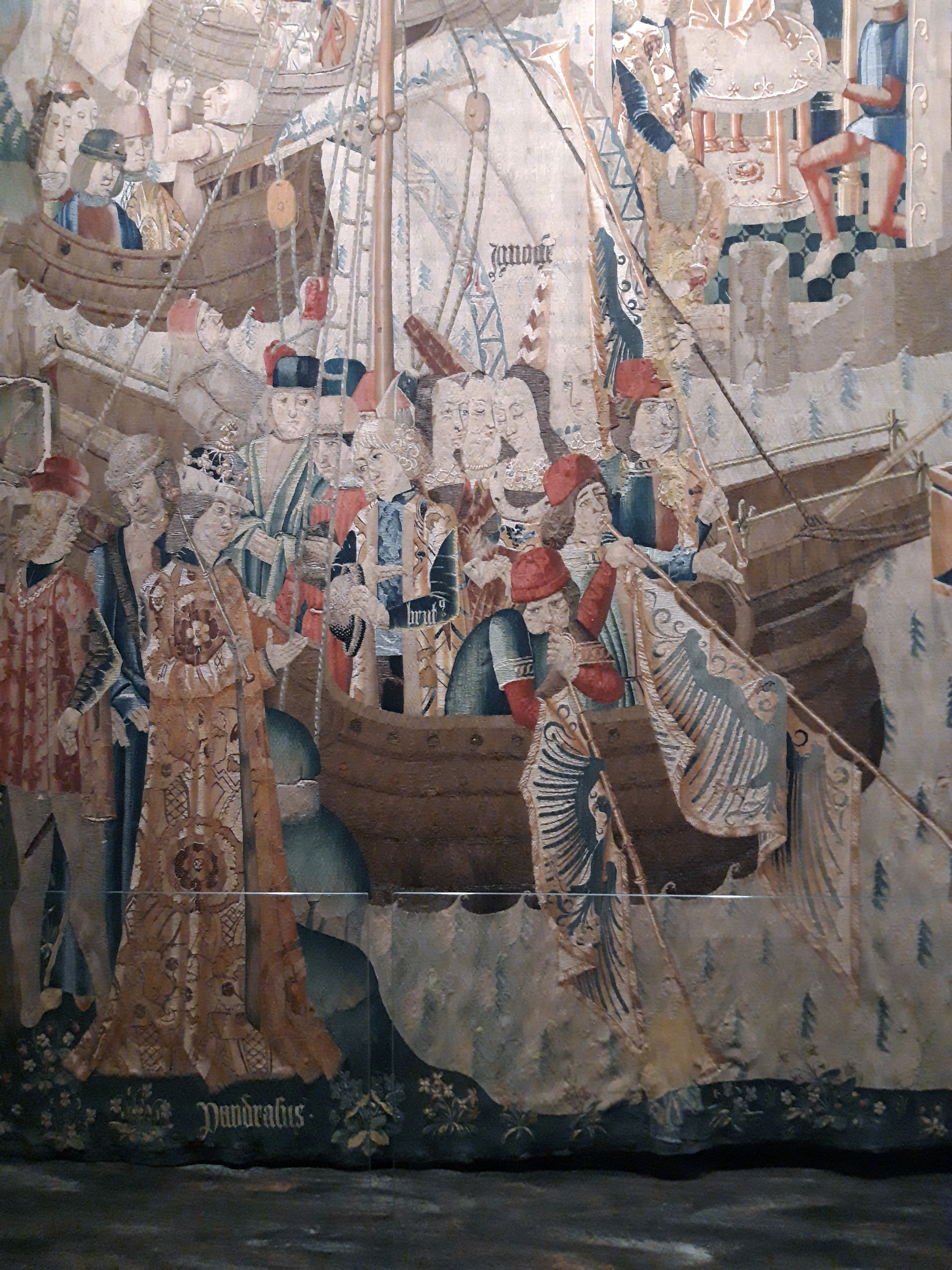
Pandrasus (lower left) in a c. 1475 tapestry now in the Cathedral of the Savior of Zaragoza

Pandrasus is the fictional king of Greece and father of Innogen in Geoffrey of Monmouth's pseudo-history Historia Regum Britanniae (c. 1136).

== Story ==
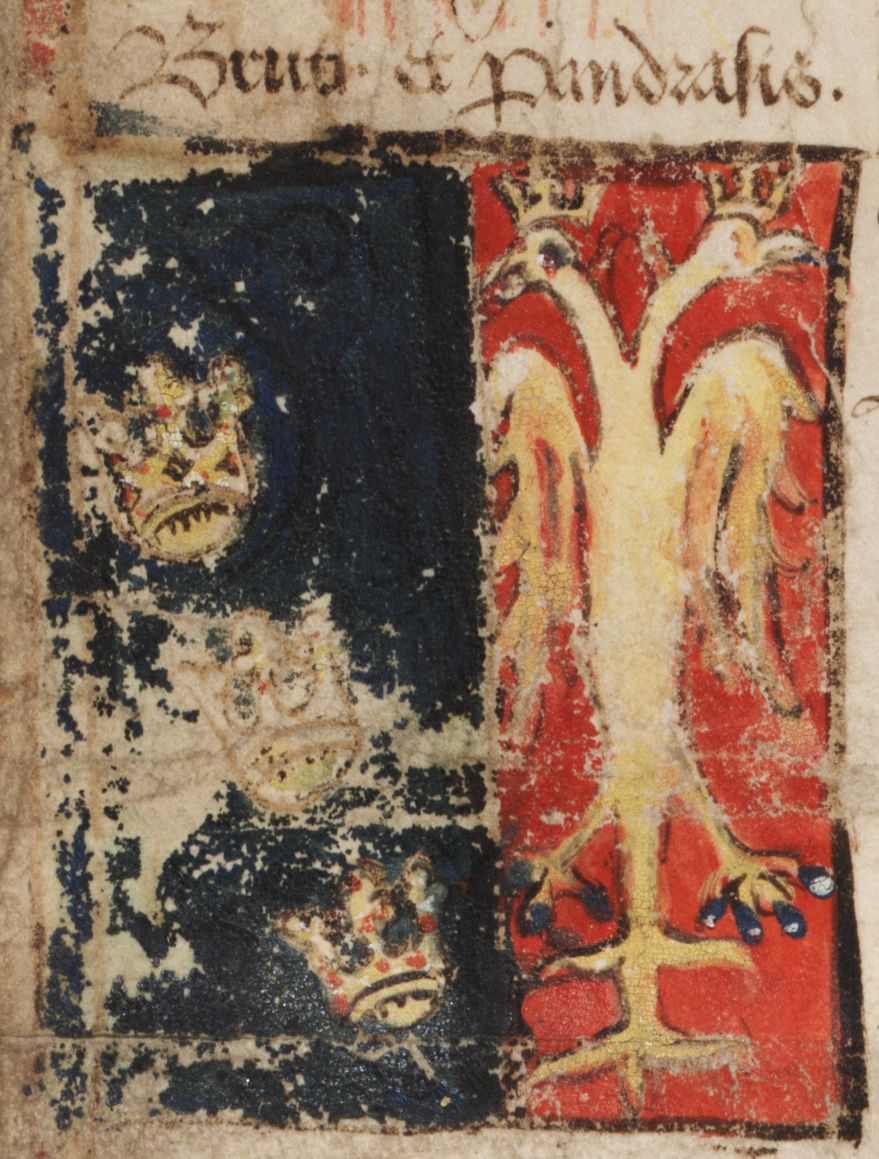
Attributed heraldic flag of Pandrasus (right) and Brutus' joined houses, from the late fifteenth century Chronicle of the History of the World

In the Historia Regum Britanniae, Pandrasus is king of the Greeks, and has enslaved the Trojan descendants of Helenus (who had been captured by Pyrrhus as punishment for the death of his father Achilles in the Trojan War). After being exiled from Italy, Brutus of Troy arrives in Greece and becomes the leader of the enslaved Trojans.

Assaracus – a Greek noble who owns three castles, and is of Trojan descent through his mother's side – sides with the Trojans after Pandrasus allows Assaracus' fully Greek half brother to take these castles. Brutus agrees to support Assaracus, gathers all the Trojans and fortifies Assaracus' towns, then retreats with Assaracus and the Trojans to the woods and hills. Brutus sends a letter to Pandrasus, requesting that the Trojans be freed and allowed either to remain living in the woods, or to depart from Greece.

Pandrasus consults with his nobles, then gathers an army to march on the town of Sparatinum where he suspects Brutus to be. Brutus ambushes them on their way to Sparatinum with three thousand men, and slaughters the Greeks as they try to fall back to the far side of the river Akalon (possibly the Achelous or Acheron). Pandrasus' brother Antigonus attempts to rally the Greeks, but ends up being captured along with his companion Anacletus. Brutus reinforces the town with six hundred men then retreats to the woods, while Pandrasus reassembles the Greek forces and then lays siege to the town.

While the Greeks are encamped around Sparatinum, Brutus forces Anacletus to trick the night sentries into leaving their posts to help Antigonus, and then attacks the sleeping Greeks, massacring nearly all of them, except Pandrasus, who is kept alive. The Trojans hold a council, and decide that they have to demand their freedom to leave Greece, with plentiful resources to do so, as Pandrasus would regain his strength and have them all killed if they remained. Pandrasus is then brought in, and threatened with a cruel death if he does not agree to this, in addition to giving Brutus the hand of his eldest daughter Innogen in marriage. Pandrasus complies, offering to remain a hostage until they leave, and says that he was glad his daughter was to be married to such a great leader as Brutus.

== Analysis ==
Pandrasus is one of several characters that appear to have been invented by Geoffrey for the Historia. Academic Jacob Hammer suggests that he may have had in mind one of the two characters named Pandarus from Virgil's Aeneid (29–19 BCE). One manuscript of the Dares Phrygius (c. fifth century CE) even spells the name Pandarus as "Pandrasus".

Peter Roberts suggests that because Greek legends state that Pyrrhus took Helenus to Epirus, Pandrasus should be considered king of Epirus, which would tally with the river Akalon mentioned in the story being the Acheron. He continues by noting that as the events of Pandrasus are said to have taken place about eighty years after the Trojan War, it also matches the timeframe of other accounts of the expulsion of the Achaeans from the Peloponnese around this time, which could have led them to build the "Spartan Castle" (Sparatinum) mentioned in the Historia, possibly around Pandosia.

Geoffrey reused the name Pandrasus later in the Historia as the name of the king of Egypt at the time of King Arthur.

== Later tradition ==
John of Hauville's Architrenius (c. 1184) describes the marriage of Innogen and Brutus, saying they "joined the royal house of Anchises to that of Greece. Pandrasus extended the royal line in one direction, Silvius in another, and the star derived from this union of stars poured forth the fuller radiance of a triple light."

Scholars from the late nineteenth to mid-twentieth century who studied Eustache Deschamps' ballad in praise of Geoffrey Chaucer (c. 1380 on) interpreted a difficult line of the poem "aux ignorans de la langue pandra" as meaning "for those ignorant of the tongue of Pandrasus". Later scholarship suggested that "a Pandarus for those ignorant of the language" was more likely, referring to Pandarus from Chaucer's Troilus and Criseyde (c. 1380s).
