= Lanassa (mythology) =

Daughter of Cleodaeus and mythical ancestor of the Molossian kings in Epirus

In Greek mythology, Lanassa (Ancient Greek: Λάνασσα) or Leonassa (Ancient Greek: Λεώνασσα) was a daughter of Cleodaeus and mythical ancestor of the Molossian kings in Epirus.

As daughter of Cleodaeus, she was great-granddaughter of the hero Heracles through his son Hyllus. In another account, she is simply called his granddaughter. While at a temple of Zeus in Dodona, she was forcibly seized by Neoptolemus, the son of Achilles and king of the Molossians.

Lanassa had eight children with Neoptolemus. In the second book of his lost Nostoi, the mythographer Lysimachus names them as Argus, Pergamus, Pandarus, Dorieus, Eraus, Danae, Eurymachus and Troas. He cites Proxenus the Epirote and Nicomedes of Acanthus as his sources. Cineas, however, records only Dorieus and Pergamus. Plutarch references the pair having a son named Pyrrhus. The historian Justin wrote that many of their daughters were married off to grow Neoptolemus' power.

Karl Wilhelm Ludwig Müller speculated that the name Lanassa was introduced as a reference to Lanassa of Syracuse, wife of the historical king Pyrrhus of Epirus.
