= Cestrinus =

Greek mythological figure

In Greek mythology, Cestrinus (Ancient Greek: Κεστρῖνος, romanized: Kestrînos, lit. 'pieces of the fish') is the only son of Helenus and Andromache, two survivors from Troy following its fall and sacking. Cestrinus was born and raised in Epirus, where he also founded his own kingdom after Helenus' death.

== Mythology ==
According to Pausanias, Cestrinus was upset when Andromache's son Molossus succeeded Helenus to the throne of Epirus. Taking a group of Epirotian volunteers, he claimed the region of Epirus north of the River Thyamis and it is because of him that the region was named Cestrine. According to another tradition, Cestrinus was king of Cimmerian Bosporus, being equated with King Genger.
