= Andromaque =

Tragedy written by Jean Racine

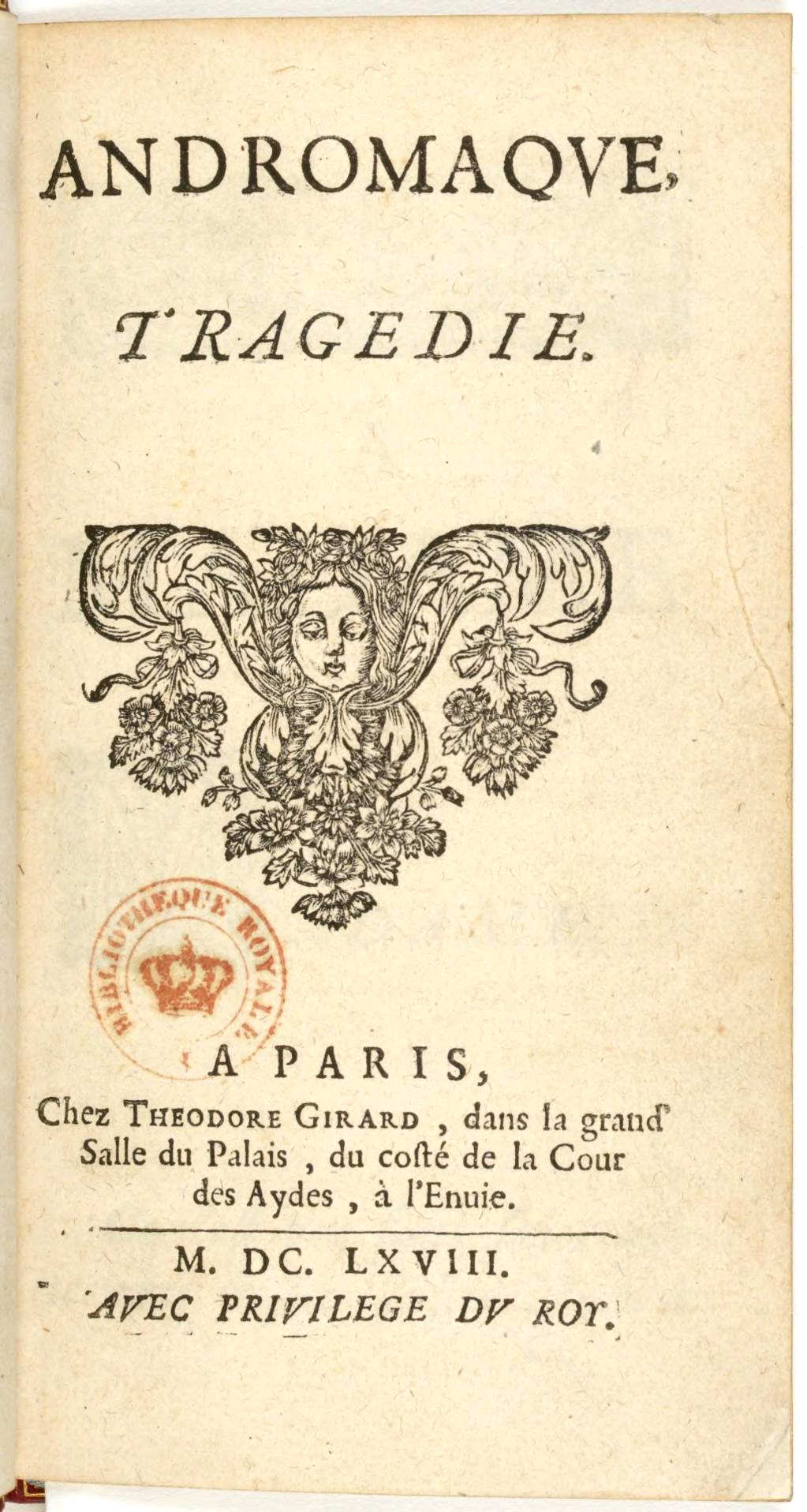
- Title page from 1668 edition of Andromaque
- Written by: Jean Racine
- Characters: Andromaque; Pyrrhus; Oreste; Hermione; Pylade; Cléone; Céphise; Phoenix
- Setting: The Royal Palace at Bouthroton in Epirus

Andromaque is a tragedy in five acts by the French playwright Jean Racine written in alexandrine verse. It was first performed on 17 November 1667 before the court of Louis XIV in the Louvre in the private chambers of the Queen, Marie Thérèse, by the royal company of actors, called "les Grands Comédiens", with Thérèse Du Parc in the title role. The company gave the first public performance two days later in the Hôtel de Bourgogne in Paris. Andromaque, the third of Racine's plays, written at the age of 27, established its author's reputation as one of the great playwrights in France.

== Origins of the play ==
Euripides' play Andromache and the third book of Virgil's Aeneid were the points of departure for Racine's play. The play takes place in the aftermath of the Trojan War, during which Andromache's husband Hector, son of Priam, has been slain by Achilles and their young son Astyanax has narrowly escaped a similar fate at the hands of Ulysses, who has unknowingly been tricked into killing another child in his place. Andromache has been taken prisoner in Epirus by Pyrrhus, son of Achilles, who is due to be married to Hermione, the only daughter of the Spartan king Menelaus and Helen of Troy. Orestes, son of Agamemnon and Clytemnestra, brother to Electra and Iphigenia, and by now absolved of the crime of matricide prophesied by the Delphic oracle, has come to the court of Pyrrhus to plead on behalf of the Greeks for the return of Astyanax.

Racine's play is a story of human passion, with the structure of an unrequited love chain: Orestes is in love with Hermione, who only wishes to please Pyrrhus, who is in love with Andromaque, who is determined to honour the memory of her murdered husband Hector and to protect the future of their son Astyanax. Orestes' presence at the court of Pyrrhus unleashes a violent undoing of the chain. At the climax, provoked by Hermione's desperation, Pyrrhus is murdered by Orestes' men in a mad rage; this only serves to deepen Hermione's despair. She takes her own life by the side of Pyrrhus and Orestes goes mad.

According to critic Félix Guirand, the play marks a turning point in the history of French theater because Racine "refashions the tragic genre as he discards the conventions of Corneille's heroic tragedy and Quinault's melodramatic tragedy and focuses simply on the human tragedy, born from the clash of passions, particularly love". In addition, the author favors "a language of simple diction, which reproduces with ease the allure of prose without ever losing poetic color", contrasting with the "tense, pompous and willingly declamatory style of Corneille and other contemporary authors".

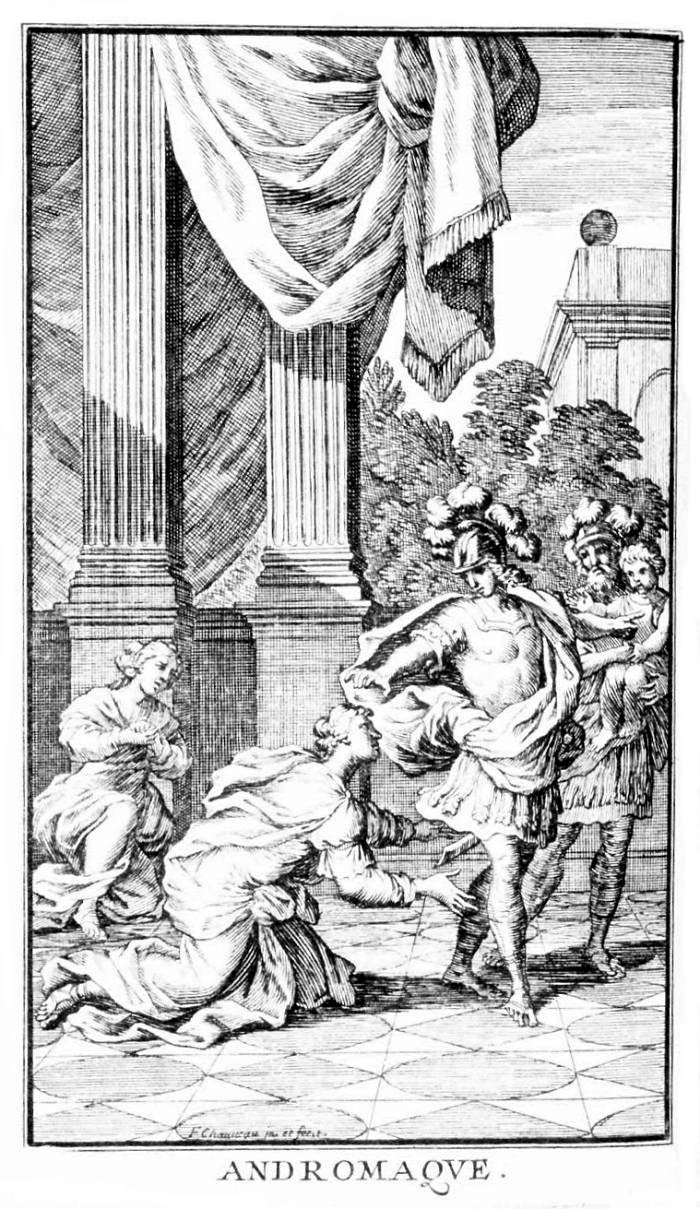
Frontispiece depicting Act III, scene 6, published in Paris in 1676

The importance of the theme of gallantry is a common feature with Racine's previous work, Alexandre le Grand. His subsequent plays gradually purified the tragic element until it reached its zenith with Phèdre.

== Characters ==
Names of characters in French, with their equivalents in English:

- Andromaque, or Andromache, widow of Hector, held captive by Pyrrhus.
- Pyrrhus, son of Achilles, king of Epirus.
- Oreste, or Orestes, son of Agamemnon.
- Hermione, daughter of Menelaus and Helen, betrothed to Pyrrhus.
- Pylade, or Pylades, a friend of Oreste.
- Cléone, or Cleone, confidante of Hermione.
- Céphise, Cephisa, confidante of Andromaque.
- Phoenix, mentor to Achilles, and then to Pyrrhus.

== Plot summary ==
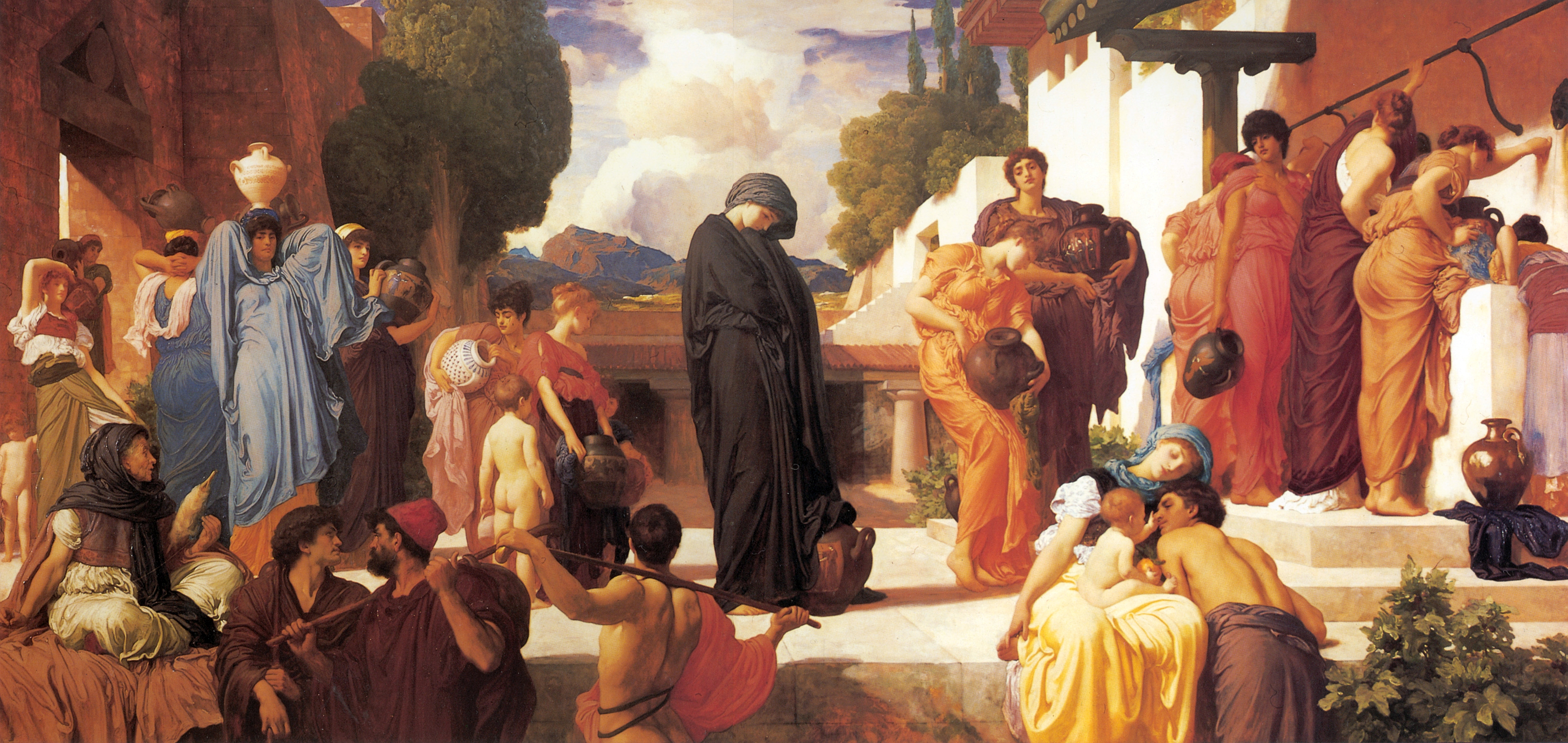
Captive Andromache by Frederic Lord Leighton

Act 1: Orestes, Greek ambassador, arrives at the court of Pyrrhus, supposedly to convince him on behalf of the Greeks to put Astyanax, the son of Andromaque and Hector, to death, for fear that he may one day avenge Troy. Actually Oreste hopes Pyrrhus will refuse, so Hermione will return to Greece with him. Pyrrhus refuses at first, then, upon being rejected by Andromaque, he threatens to turn Astyanax over to the Greeks.

Act 2: Orestes speaks to Hermione, who agrees to leave with him if Pyrrhus allows it. However, Pyrrhus, heretofore uninterested in Hermione, announces to Orestes that he has decided to marry her, and that he will give him Astyanax.

Act 3: Orestes is furious over having lost Hermione for good. Andromaque begs Hermione to influence Pyrrhus to spare her son, but Hermione, insanely proud, refuses her. Pyrrhus agrees to reverse his decision if Andromaque will marry him. She hesitates, unsure of what to do.

Act 4: Andromaque resolves to marry Pyrrhus in order to save her son, but intends suicide as soon as the ceremony is over, so that she remains faithful to her late husband Hector. Hermione asks Orestes to avenge her scorn from Pyrrhus by killing him.

Act 5: Hermione regrets asking for Pyrrhus' death. Before she can cancel her request, Orestes appears and announces that Pyrrhus is dead, though not at Orestes' hand — his Greeks became enraged when Pyrrhus recognized Astyanax as king of Troy. She thanks him with wild insults and runs off to kill herself on Pyrrhus' body. Orestes becomes crazed and has a vision of the Furies.

== Reception and adaptations ==
Unlike the majority of Racine's plays, Andromaque has never gone out of vogue, and the tragedy is among the most venerable works of the Comédie-Française's repertoire. It is also the most often read and studied classicist play in French schools. Jacques Rivette's four-hour film L'amour fou centers around rehearsals of a production of Andromaque.

The composer André Grétry wrote a three-act opera, Andromaque, with a libretto based on the Racine play, which premiered in 1780. In addition, Rossini's two-act 1819 opera, Ermione, is based on Racine's play as is Herbert Windt's 1931 opera Andromache.

In 1984 a new verse English translation of Andromaque (called Andromache) was commissioned by Cheek by Jowl theatre company from the writer and translator David Bryer. This British première performance of Andromache was at the Paxton Suite, Buxton on 9 August 1984. The play was then performed during 1984–1985. Between 2007–2009 Cheek by Jowl performed Andromaque in French. The first performance of this production was at Théâtre du Nord, Lille on 4 October 2007. In 2009 the play was performed in French as a co-production by Théâtre du Nord, Lille, and Cheek by Jowl at the Oxford Playhouse. Both productions were directed by Declan Donnellan and designed by Nick Ormerod.

A new version translated into English by Edward Kemp was premiered as a stage production at RADA in 2015 and broadcast as a radio play on BBC Radio 3 in January 2017.

In 2021, David Bryer updated his translation of Andromache for a production by the Oxford Theatre Guild to be performed at Trinity College, Oxford.
