= Epirot Islands =

Group of islands in the Ionian Sea

Epirote Islands are those northern Ionian Islands that are in proximity to the Epirus mainland.

These include:

- Kerkyra (Κέρκυρα) usually known as Corfu in English
- Paxi (Παξοί) (includes Antipaxos) also known as Paxos in English
- Lefkada (Λευκάδα) also known as Lefkas in English
- Ithaki (Ιθάκη) usually known as Ithaca (the island of Odysseus) in English

== Legend ==
The Ionian Islands

According to legend, the Epirote Islands were ruled by the descendants of Neoptolemus (or Pyrrhus), who came there, defeating the native Molossoi, after the events of the Trojan War. The island of Ithaki was also the legendary home of Odysseus, though he was exiled by Neoptolemus after the slaughter of Penelope's suitors in the Odyssey.

== History ==
At the outbreak of the Peloponnesian War in 431 BCE most of the islands, notably Kerkyra, took the side of Athens but Lefkada took the side of Sparta.

In the 4th century BCE under another king Neoptolemos of the same dynasty, Molossoi (or Molossians) became more urbanized inhabiting also the area of contemporary Zagoria, where significant archeological findings (kept in the Ioannina archeological museum) were excavated in the villages of Elafotopos and Vitsa by the Vikos gorge. Still herding the western highlands of the Pindos in Zagoria, Molossoi were in constant friction over grazing, with Macedonians on the other side of the range.

When, by the Treaty of Paris of November 5, 1815, the Ionian Islands became a protectorate of the United Kingdom, Corfu became the seat of the British high commissioner. The British commissioners, who were practically autocrats in spite of the retention of the native senate and assembly, introduced a strict method of government which brought about a decided improvement in the material prosperity of the islands, but by its very strictness displeased the natives. In 1864 it was, with the other Ionian Islands, ceded to the kingdom of Greece, in accordance with the wishes of the inhabitants.

== The islands today ==
Today all the islands are part of the Greek region of Ionian Islands. Kerkyra has a population of 97,000, Lefkada 21,000, Ithaki 3,000 and Paxi 2,000.

In recent decades the islands have lost population through emigration and the decline of their traditional industries, fishing and marginal agriculture. Today their major industry is tourism. Kerkyra in particular, with its magnificent harbour, splendid scenery and wealth of picturesque ruins and castles, is a favourite stopping place for cruise liners. British tourists in particular are attracted through having read Gerald Durrell's evocative book My Family and Other Animals (1956), which describes his childhood on Kerkyra in the 1930s.
