= Lysimachus of Alexandria =

Lysimachus of Alexandria (Ancient Greek: Λυσίμαχος ό Άλεξανδρεύς; 1st century BCE) was an Egyptian grammarian. According to Josephus in Against Apion (Book I, Chapter 34) he followed criticism of the traditional Jewish record of Moses and the Exodus found in the works of Manetho and Chaeremon of Alexandria.
