= Talthybius =

Herald and friend to Agamemnon during Trojan War

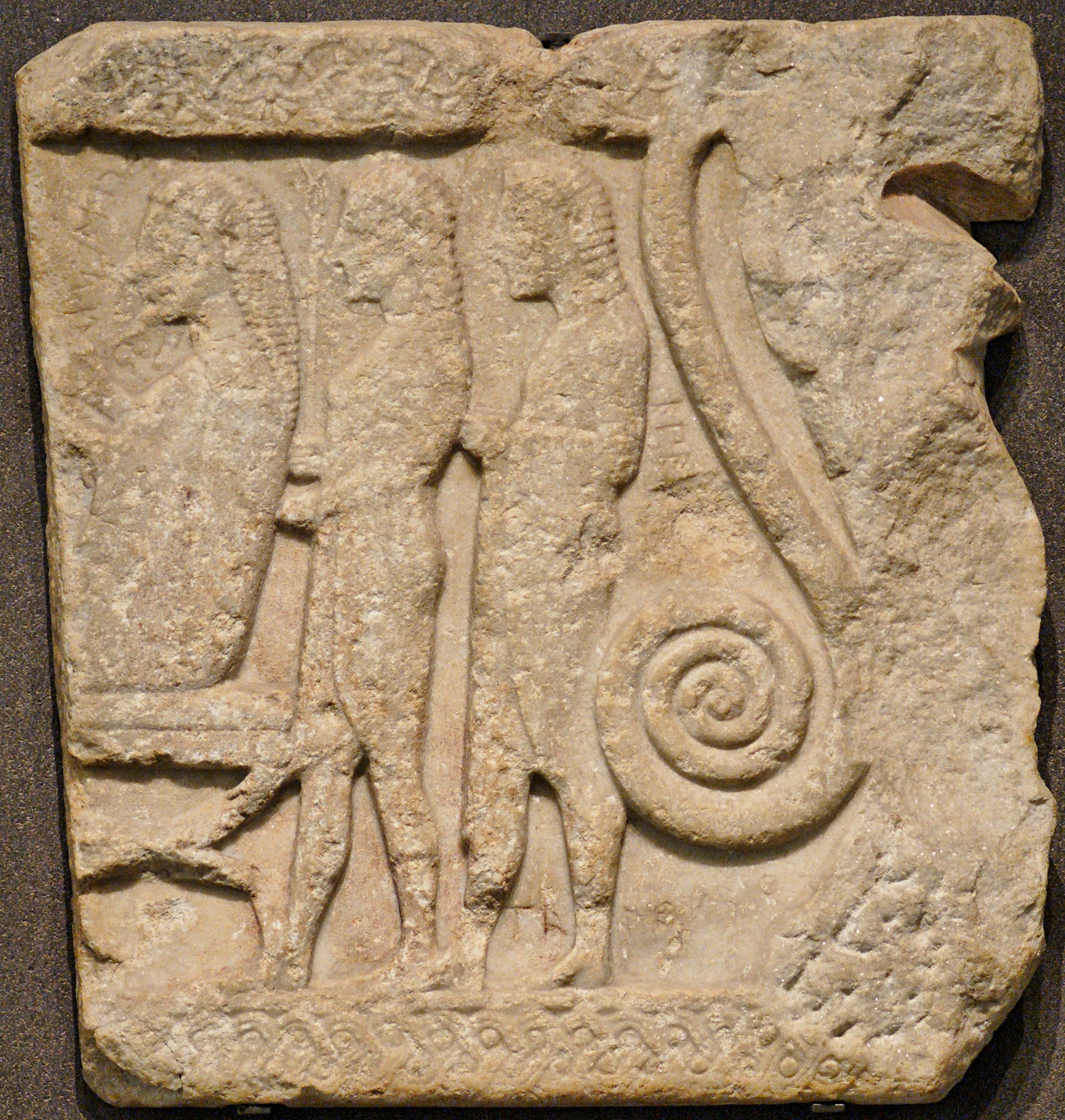
Agamemnon, Talthybius and Epeius, relief from Samothrace, ca. 560 BC, Louvre.

Talthybius (Note: Occasionally spelled Talthubius.) (Ancient Greek: Ταλθύβιος) was herald and friend to Agamemnon in the Trojan War. Talthybius is a Greek soldier who serves as both a messenger and a herald during the time of the Trojan War. Only two mortal men are present in Euripides' play The Trojan Women, and Talthybius is the one who interacts with the Trojan women the most. Although he represents a hostile nation, he surprisingly shows his vulnerable side and affection towards these women. Even though he must obey orders (which in result, he will end up hurting these women) he does make an effort to lessen their suffering. Talthybius is a complex character who tries to be empathetic despite enabling the rape and enslavement of Troy's women.

== Mythology ==
Talthybius was the one who took Briseis from the tent of Achilles. Preceding the duel of Menelaus and Paris, Agamemnon charges him to fetch a sheep for sacrifice. He died at Aegium in Achaia, according to Pausanias.

Talthybius appears in Euripides' Hecuba and The Trojan Women. In addition, he has a small role in The Iliad. In Book IV, Agamemnon orders Talthybius to fetch the medic Machaon after Menelaus is wounded with an arrow shot by Pandarus. In Hecuba and The Trojan Women, Talthybius seems to always be the bearer of bad news. In The Trojan Women, he tells Hecuba that all of the women are being divided up and given to different Greek Heroes as slaves. He says that Cassandra will be given to Agamemnon and that Hecuba herself will be given to Odysseus. Furthermore, Talthybius is the one who tells Andromache of the Greeks' plan to kill Astyanax, her son by Hector. The plan is to throw Astyanax (who is only a small child) from the towers of Troy because it would not be wise to let the son of a Trojan hero reach adulthood. In Hecuba, Talthybius brings an order from Agamemnon to Hecuba, telling her to bury her daughter, Polyxena, who was sacrificed to Achilles.

He exercises significant independence in the way he carries out his orders given to him from the commanders. He served in the Trojan War alongside his followers and others who supported him. Talthybius was committed to the interests of the Greek commanders and takes care to avoid their disapproval. In his dealings with the captive women he is felt in the main to be a sympathetic figure.

== Worship ==
He was worshipped as a hero at Sparta and Argos, where sacrifices were offered to him. According to Herodotus, "At Sparta there is a shrine of Talthybius and descendants of Talthybius called Talthybiadae, who have the special privilege of conducting all embassies from Sparta.

== See also ==
- Eurybates
