= Neoptolemus =

Greek mythological figure; son of Achilles

- Prince of Skyros
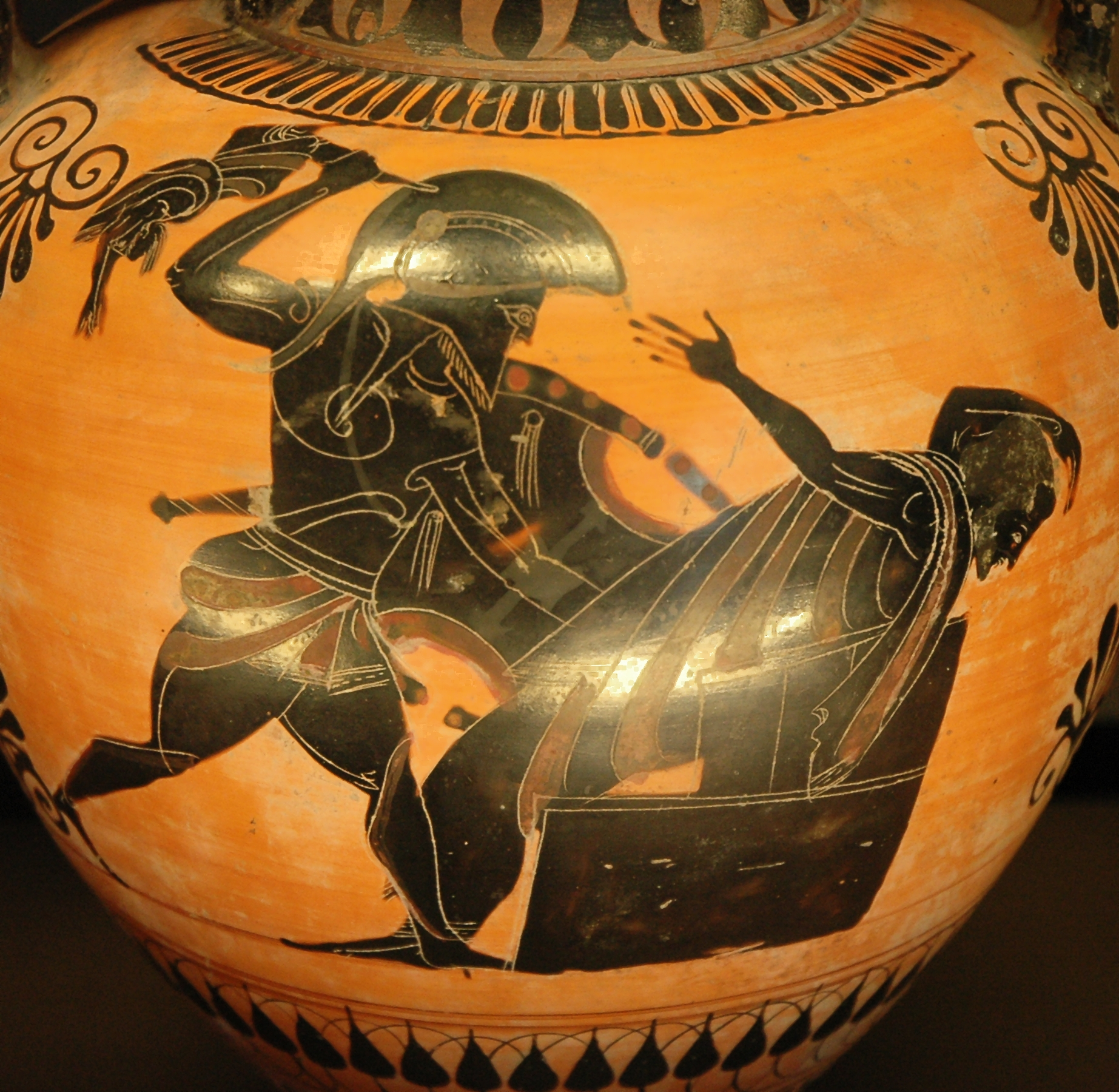
- Neoptolemus killing Priam
- Other names: Pyrrhus, Achillides, Pelides, Aeacides
- Abode: Skyros

Genealogy
- Parents: (a) Achilles and Deidamia (b) Achilles and Iphigenia
- Siblings: Oneiros
- Consort: (1) Andromache (2) Hermione
- Offspring: (1) Molossus, Pielus, Pergamus and Amphialus; Ethnestus

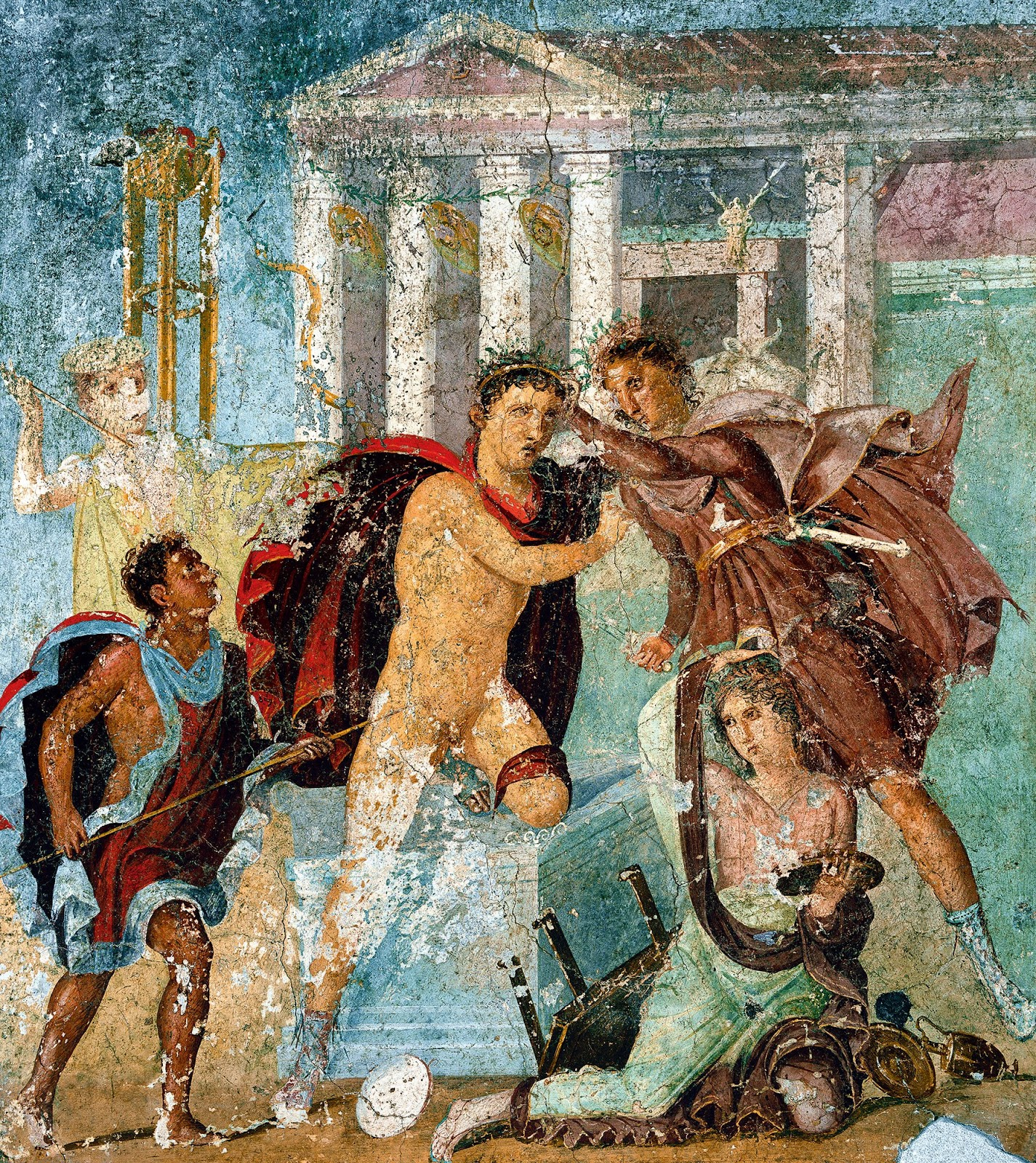
Scene from the tragedy Andromache by Euripides: Orestes kills Neoptolemus at the altar of Apollo in Delphi. Despairing Hermione, wife of Neoptolemus but previously promised to Orestes, kneels at the foot of the altar. Roman fresco in Pompeii

Neoptolemus's Kingdom, Epirus

In Greek mythology, Neoptolemus (/ˌniːəpˈtɒlɪməs/; Ancient Greek: Νεοπτόλεμος, romanized: Neoptólemos, lit. 'new warrior or young warrior'), originally called Pyrrhus at birth (/ˈpɪrəs/; Πύρρος, Pýrrhos, 'red'), was the son of the mythical warrior Achilles and the princess Deidamia, and the brother of Oneiros. He became the progenitor of the ruling dynasty of the Molossians of ancient Epirus. In a reference to his pedigree, Neoptolemus was sometimes called Achillides (from his father Achilles' name) or, from his grandfather's or great-grandfather's names, Pelides or Aeacides. According to Pseudo-Apollodorus, he is the ancestor of Olympias, mother to Alexander the Great. According to Plutarch, Neoptolemus was also the ancestor of Pyrrhus of Epirus.

In Philostratus work Heroicus, Neoptolemus is said to have received his name in honor of Achilles’ youth, when Achilles first took up arms and began his life as a warrior.

In Scholia to Lycophron's Alexandra, John Tzetzes writes that the term "Skyrian dragon" refers to Neoptolemus because of his violent and bloodthirsty nature.

The phrase the "Punishment of Neoptolemus" (Νεοπτολέμειος τίσις) refers to a form of retribution in which a person suffers the same wrong that they once inflicted on another. The expression derives from the story of Neoptolemus, who killed Priam at an altar and later met his own death at an altar.

== Description ==
In his Chronography the chronicler Malalas described Neoptolemus as "of good stature, good chest, thin, white, good nose, ruddy hair, wooly hair, light-eyed, big-eyed, blond eyebrows, blond beginnings of a beard, round-faced, precipitate, daring, agile, a fierce fighter". Meanwhile, in the account of Dares the Phrygian, he was described as "large, robust, and easily irritated. He lisped slightly, and was good-looking, with a hooked nose, round eyes, and shaggy eyebrows".

When the Phoenician character asks about Neoptolemus in the work Heroicus by Philostratus, the vine-dresser character replies that he was a man of noble character. Though he did not match his father Achilles in greatness, he was by no means an unremarkable figure, certainly no less distinguished than Ajax, son of Telamon. He adds, reporting Protesilaus’s account that Neoptolemus was strikingly handsome and bore a strong resemblance to Achilles in his appearance, but was inferior to him "in the same way that beautiful people are inferior to their statues".

== Mythology ==
=== Background and birth ===
In the Cypria, Achilles sails to Skyros after a failed expedition to Troy, marries princess Deidamia and fathers Neoptolemus with her before being called to arms yet again.

In Hyginus's Fabulae, Achilles's mother Thetis learns that he would die if he were to go to war at Troy. She tries to prevent him from being called to fight in the Trojan War by hiding him, disguised as a woman, in the court of Lycomedes, the king of Skyros. During his stay, Achilles has an affair with the princess, Deidamia, who then gives birth to Neoptolemus (originally called Pyrrhus because his father called himself the female equivalent, Pyrrha, while disguised as a woman).

In another version depicted in the Achilleid by Statius, Achilles reveals he is a man to Princess Deidamia by raping her, resulting in the birth of Neoptolemus. Ovid previously speculated such in Ars Amatoria but left it up to interpretation if he were correct.

Most accounts mention Deidamia being Neoptolemus's mother, but in some accounts, he was the son of Achilles by Iphigenia instead. In those accounts, his father transported him to the island of Skyros after the sacrifice of his mother.

=== Trojan War ===
The Greeks captured the Trojan seer Helenus and forced him to tell them under what conditions they could take Troy. Helenus revealed to them that they could defeat Troy if they could acquire the poisonous arrows of Heracles (then in the possession of Philoctetes); steal the Palladium (which led to the building of the famous wooden horse of Troy); and put Achilles' son in the war.

The Greeks then sent Odysseus to retrieve Neoptolemus, then a mere teenager, from Skyros. The two then went to Lemnos to retrieve Philoctetes. (Years earlier, on the way to Troy, Philoctetes had been bitten by a snake on Chryse Island.) Agamemnon had advised that he be left behind because the wound was festering and smelled bad. Philoctetes's retrieval is the plot of Philoctetes, a play by Sophocles.

In Philostratus’s work it is Neoptolemus and Diomedes who go to Lemnos and bring Philoctetes to Troy.

Some sources portray Neoptolemus as brutal. He killed at least six on the field of battle and several more during the subsequent fall of Troy (Priam, Eurypylus, Polyxena, Polites and Astyanax [Hector and Andromache's infant son] among others). He captured Helenus and made Andromache his concubine. The ghost of Achilles appeared to the survivors of the war, demanding the Trojan princess Polyxena be sacrificed before anybody could leave for home; Neoptolemus was the one to carry out the sacrifice. (In scene (ll 566–575) of Euripides's play Hekabe (also known as Hecuba) Neoptolemus is shown as a torn young man who kills Polyxena in the least painful way possible, contrasting with his usual brutal and uncompassionate image.) With Andromache, Helenus and Phoenix, Neoptolemus then sailed to the Epirot Islands and became the king of Epirus.

By the enslaved Andromache, daughter of Cilician king Eëtion, Neoptolemus was the father of Molossos (and, according to the myth, therefore an ancestor of Olympias, the mother of Alexander the Great), Pielus, Pergamus and Amphialus.

Hyginus has a section on Amphialus:

Neoptolemus, son of Achilles and Deidamia, begat Amphialus by captive Andromache, daughter of Ēëtion. But after he heard that Hermione his betrothed had been given to Orestes in marriage, he went to Lacedaemon and demanded her from Menelaus. Menelaus did not wish to go back on his word, and took Hermione from Orestes and gave her to Neoptolemus. Orestes, thus insulted, slew Neoptolemus as he was sacrificing to Delphi, and recovered Hermione. The bones of Neoptolemus were scattered through the land of Ambracia, which is in the district of Epirus.

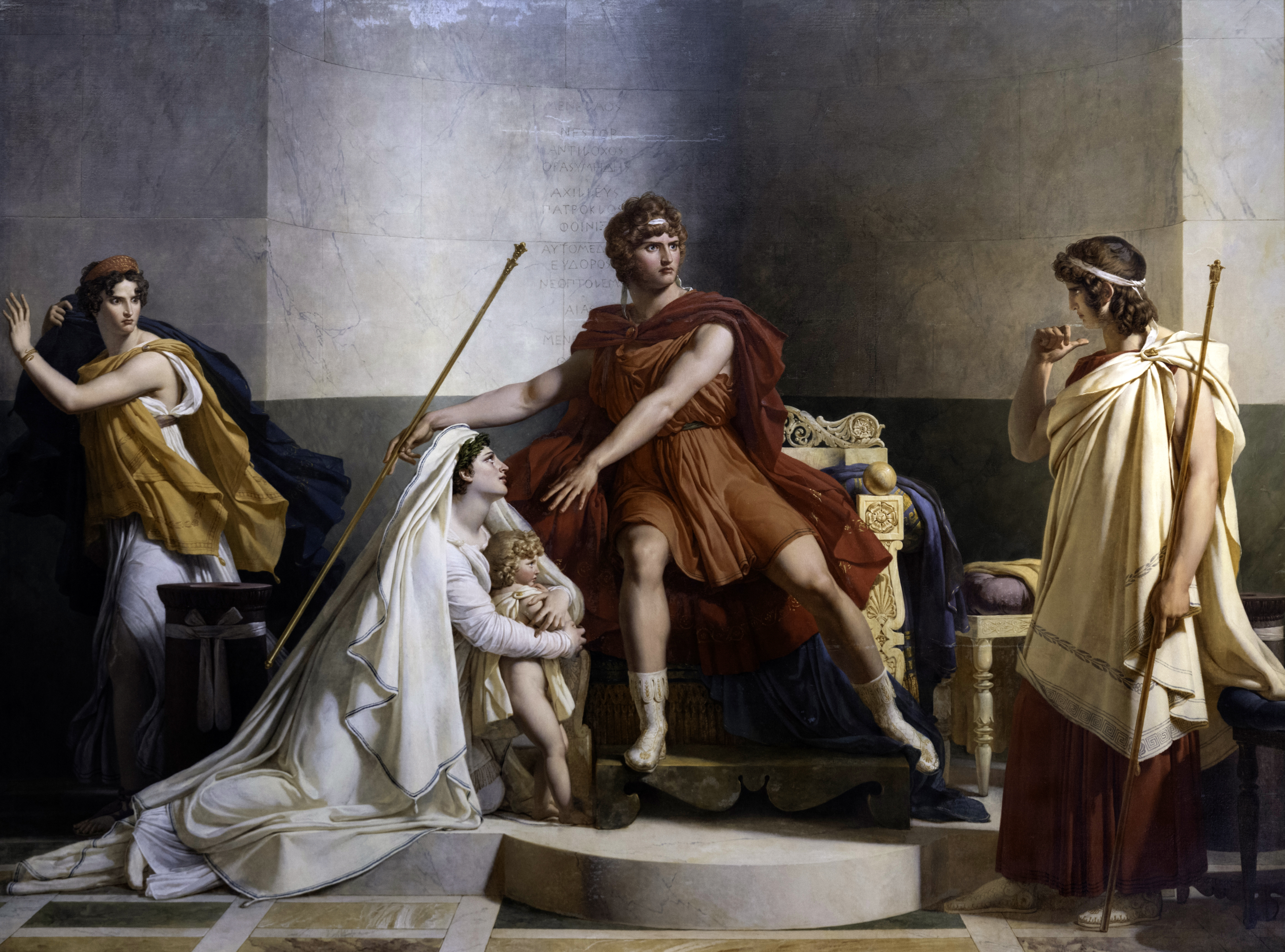
Andromache and Pyrrhus, by Pierre-Narcisse Guérin, 1810

By Lanassa, granddaughter of Heracles, he fathered eight children.

As in Euripides's Hekabe, Sophocles’s Philoctetes also shows him as a much kinder man, who honours his promises and shows remorse when he is made to trick Philoctetes.

=== After the war ===
After leaving Troy, Neoptolemus' ships stopped on Tenedos with many other Greeks. His grandmother, the nymph Thetis, instructed him to stay on the island for two more days and sacrifice. Many who departed were killed at sea. Neoptolemus decided to make the rest of the journey by land, accompanied by the Trojan Helenus. He buried his father's advisor, Phoenix, who had died on the way.

Leaving Tenedos, Neoptolemus set out to conquer the land of the Molossians. He defeated them in battle and became king of Epirus. According to Pindar, the god Apollo, angered by his murder of Priam, would ensure Neoptolemus never made it back to his homeland.

After Helenus founded a city in Epirus, Neoptolemus wedded his mother Deidamia to him. Neoptolemus himself would father sons on his slave Andromache, including Molossus, Pergamus and Pielus. He would also marry the Spartan princess Hermione, since she had been promised to him by her father Menelaus at Troy.

At the temple of Zeus in Dodona, Neoptolemus abducted Lanassa, a descendant of Heracles. He fathered eight children with her, including a son named Pyrrhus. He married off some of his daughters to form alliances with neighboring lands, growing his power.

In the Greek Questions by Plutarch, it is mentioned that Neoptolemus was summoned by both the relatives of the slain suitors and Odysseus's side to serve as an arbiter after the slaughter of the suitors. He judged that Odysseus should leave Ithaca and be exiled from Cephallenia, Zacynthus and Ithaca because of the killings, while the companions and relatives of the suitors should provide yearly compensation to Odysseus for the losses they had caused to his estate. Odysseus then transferred his right to receive this compensation to his son Telemachus and departed for Italy to live in exile. Apollodorus adds that Neoptolemus hoped to gain control of Cephallenia once Odysseus was out of the way.

According to tradition the city of Byllis in Illyria was founded by the Myrmidons led by Neoptolemus.

Stephanus of Byzantium states that, according to Rhianus’ now-lost work Thessalika, the Thessalian tribe of the Ethnestae (Ἐθνέσται) took its name from Ethnestus or Ethnestes (Εθνέστης), one of the sons of Neoptolemus.

=== Death ===
There are different accounts of Neoptolemus death. According to one tradition, he was killed by Orestes because of their conflict over Hermione, whom Neoptolemus had married despite her previous engagement to Orestes. In some versions of the myth, Pylades is also said to have participated in the killing alongside Orestes. According to another tradition, Neoptolemus was killed at Delphi by Machaereus, a Delphian, when he came to seek redress from Apollo for the murder of his father, Achilles. Strabo also offers an alternative explanation, suggesting that Neoptolemus was killed by Machaereus because he had attacked the sanctuary of Apollo.

The earliest extant references to Neoptolemus' death come from Pindar. He records two versions which both take place at Delphi. In one, Apollo, angered by the death of Priam, kills Neoptolemus directly as he argues with attendants over payment. In the other, he is slain by an unnamed person while quarreling over sacrificial meats. He had come to offer some spoils from Troy, however it was destined that a descendant of Aeacus should watch over the sanctuary forever.

After Neoptolemus's death his kingdom was partitioned. According to Virgil's Aeneid, Helenus (who later married Andromache) took part of it: "Helenus, a son of Priam, was king over these Greek cities of Epirus, having succeeded to the throne and bed of Pyrrhus ...".

== Grave at Delphi ==
Strabo states that Neoptolemus tomb was constructed in accordance with an oracle and was located within the sacred precinct at Delphi.

Pausanias (geographer) reports that the Delphians identified the hearth near the Temple of Apollo (Delphi) where Neoptolemus was believed to have been killed and showed it to visitors. They also identified a nearby grave as his tomb. Neoptolemus was honoured as a hero at Delphi, and the Delphians performed annual sacrifices in his honour. Pausanias further mentions that Neoptolemus was the only member of the Greek army represented by Polygnotus as still killing the Trojans in his painting. This was because Polygnotus intended the painting to be placed above Neoptolemus grave.

Heliodorus of Emesa also describes commemorative rites performed in Neoptolemus honour. Every four years, during the Pythian Games, the Aenians sent a sacred embassy to Delphi to offer sacrifices and perform funeral rites for him.

== Cicero's reference to Neoptolemus ==
Cicero in his work De Oratore refers to Neoptolemus as an example of a person who acquired a name through his actions. Neoptolemus was originally called Pyrrhus but gained the name "Neoptolemus" through his exploits at Troy. Cicero uses this story to make a joke about a Roman politician named Nummius, whose name resembles the Latin word nummus ("coin"). Since Nummius was known for distributing money during elections, Cicero quips that he "found a name" in the Campus Martius, a large public area in ancient Rome where citizens gathered for various civic activities, including elections, just as Neoptolemus found one at Troy.

Cicero, in another passage of his work, refers to Neoptolemus as portrayed in Ennius’ tragedy to argue that an orator should engage with philosophy only to a limited extent, enough to gain useful insight, but not so deeply as to become a professional philosopher. He uses Neoptolemus as a literary example because the character was associated with practical action rather than only abstract theorizing.

== In art and literature ==
- The lost wall painting by Polygnotus at Delphi, described by Pausanias, portrays scenes from the aftermath of the Trojan War, especially the fall of Troy, and includes Neoptolemus among its figures.
- Neoptolemus was depicted on the pedestal of Pheidias statue of Nemesis at Rhamnous, alongside Agamemnon and Menelaus.
- Neoptolemus is one of the main characters in Philoctetes, a tragedy by Sophocles.
- Andromache, a tragedy by Euripides. Neoptolemus does not appear on stage but his death at Delphi is described
- Two hymns preserved in the Greek Anthology mentioning Neoptolemus. One of them calls him the "sacker of Troy" and the "saviour of the Greeks".
- Apollodorus' Library, in Book 3 and in the Epitome 5.10–12, 5.21, 5.24
- The Sack of Troy, an epic poem by Tryphiodorus.
- Neoptolemus, a tragedy by Nicomachus of Alexandria Troas.
- Neoptolemus, a play by the comic poet Theophilus.
- The Aeneid by Virgil
- Trojan Women by Seneca
- The Posthomerica, an epic poem by Quintus of Smyrna
- In Historia Regum Britanniae, he enslaved Helenus and other Trojans in revenge for the death of his father
- In Confessio Amantis Book 4 line 2161ff he is the slayer of the Amazon Penthesilea
- The Tragedy of Dido by Christopher Marlowe
- Pyrrhus features in the player's speech in Shakespeare's Hamlet (Act 2, Scene 2) where his killing of Priam is described
- The Second Part of the Iron Age, the final play in the Ages series by Thomas Heywood
- Pyrrhus is a leading character in Andromaque (1667), a play by Jean Racine
- Astianatte (1725), an opera by Leonardo Vinci
- Andromaque (1780), an opera by Grétry based on Racine's play
- Ermione (1819), an opera by Gioachino Rossini based on Racine's play
- An Arrow's Flight, a novel by Mark Merlis (1998)
- The Song of Troy, a novel written by Colleen McCullough (1998)
- The Golden Prince, a novel written by Ken Catran (1999)
- The Song of Achilles, a novel by Madeline Miller (2011)
- The Silence of the Girls, a novel written by Pat Barker (2018)
- Pyrrhus (you go where I cannot), a song by Paris Paloma (2026)

Mentioned briefly in Euripides's plays Trojan Women and Hecuba, simply stating that Andromache, wife of Hector, was his promised spear bride.
