= Hermione (mythology) =

Daughter of Menelaus and Helen of Troy

- Queen of Mycenae and Sparta
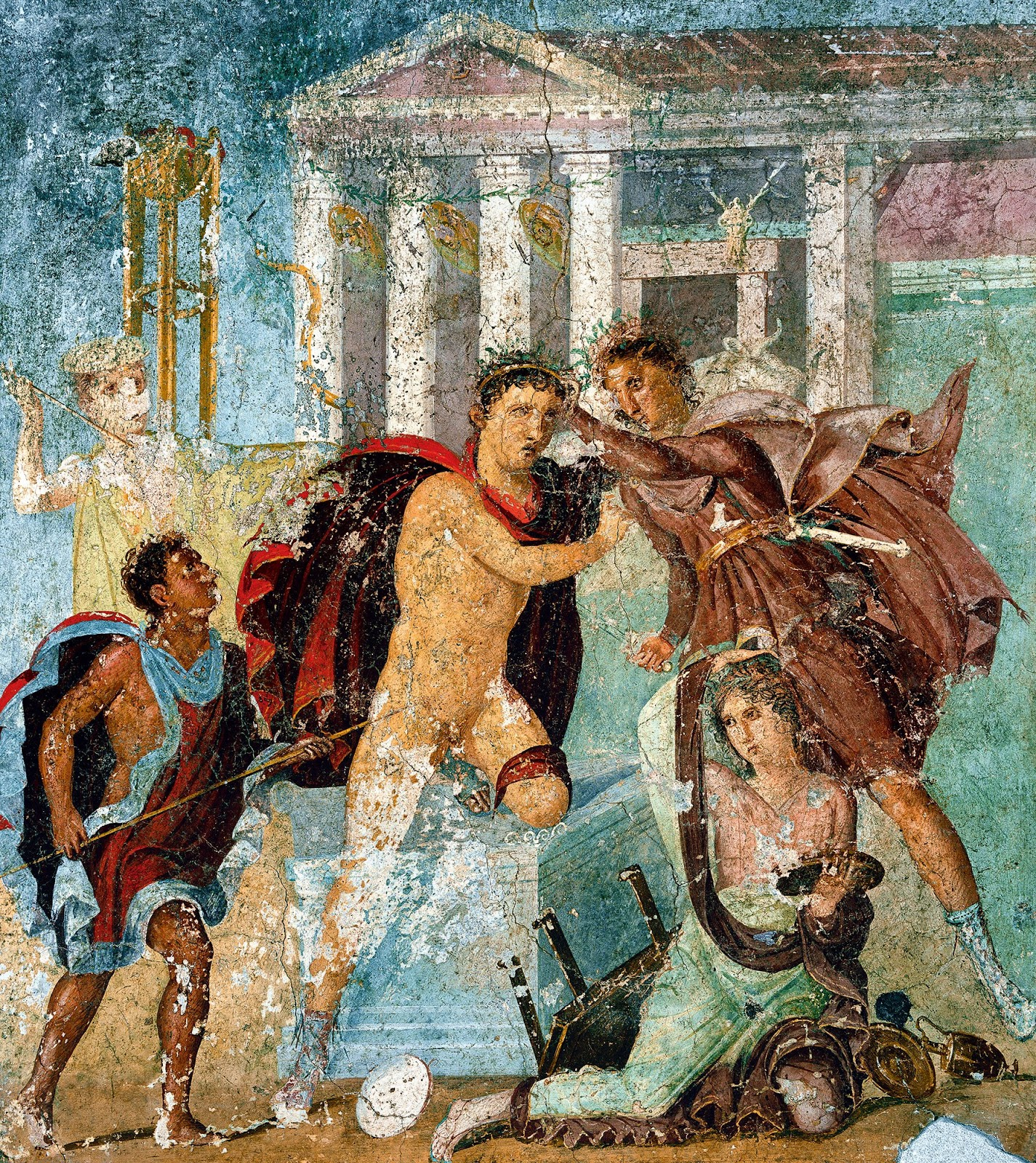
- Scene from the tragedy Andromache by Euripides: Orestes kills Neoptolemus at the altar of Apollo in Delphi. Despairing Hermione, wife of Neoptolemus but previously promised to Orestes, kneels at the foot of the altar. Roman fresco in Pompeii.

Genealogy
- Parents: Menelaus (father); Helen (mother)
- Spouse: Neoptolemus; Orestes
- Children: Tisamenus

In Greek mythology, Hermione (/hɜːrˈmaɪ.əni/; Ancient Greek: Ἑρμιόνη, romanized: Hermiónē, lit. 'messenger', 'earthly' or 'stone', [hermi.ónɛː]) was the daughter of Menelaus, king of Sparta, and his wife, Helen of Troy. Prior to the Trojan War, Hermione had been betrothed by Tyndareus, her grandfather, to her cousin Orestes, son of her uncle, Agamemnon. According to Apollodorus, she was nine years old when her mother eloped with Paris, son of the Trojan king Priam.

During the war, Menelaus promised her to Achilles' son, Neoptolemus. After the war ended, he sent Hermione away to the city of Phthia (the home of Peleus and Achilles), where Neoptolemus was staying. The two were married, yet, soon afterwards, Neoptolemus traveled to Delphi to exact vengeance against Apollo for having caused his father's death, only to be killed there. With Neoptolemus dead, Hermione was free to marry Orestes, with whom she had a son, Tisamenus.

== Family ==
Helen nursing Hermione with Turan (Aphrodite) and Paris by her side. Etruscan bronze mirror, 5th century BC

According to Homer, Hermione was the only child of the Spartan queen Helen with her first husband, Menelaus. She was thus niece of Clytemnestra and Agamemnon, and cousin to Iphigenia, Electra, and Orestes. Her father sired another child, Megapenthes, with a slave woman, and held their weddings at the same time.

In other sources, Helen does have more children, such as Nicostratus. Alternatively, they were Menelaus’ illegitimate sons with other women. According to Pausanias, this was why Hermione's husband Orestes became king of Sparta after Menelaus’ death. Together, the couple had a son called Tisamenus.

On an Etruscan mirror, Helen appears next to her second husband, Paris, with an infant Hermione. One scholar suggests this represented a version of the myth where Paris was Hermione's father, instead of the more usual Menelaus.

== Mythology ==
In the Odyssey, Homer describes Hermione with the beauty of golden Aphrodite. She was left in Sparta when her mother eloped with the Trojan prince Paris. She was nine years of age. According to Euripides, she was brought up by Helen's sister Clytemnestra, who was the mother of her future husband Orestes. Pausanias records how, even after he killed his mother, Hermione stayed by Orestes' side through everything.

She was at various points betrothed to both Orestes and Neoptolemus. Ancient poets disagree over whether Menelaus was involved in both betrothals. Euripides has Orestes say:

Because, in fact, you were rightfully mine, from a long time ago. Your father has promised you to me before he left for Troy but then, the liar that he is, when he got to Troy, he offered you to Neoptolemos, your present husband, if he, in return captured the city.

— Andromache 969, translation by George Theodoridis

Ovid, on the contrary, says that Menelaus did not even know of the promise made by Tyndareus, grandfather of Hermione and Orestes:

(Hermione) "Tyndareus gave me to you, he, my ancestor, heavy with experience,
and years: the grandfather decided for the grand-child.
But Menelaus, my father, made a promise of me, unaware of this act."

— Heroides 8.31., translation by A. S. Kline

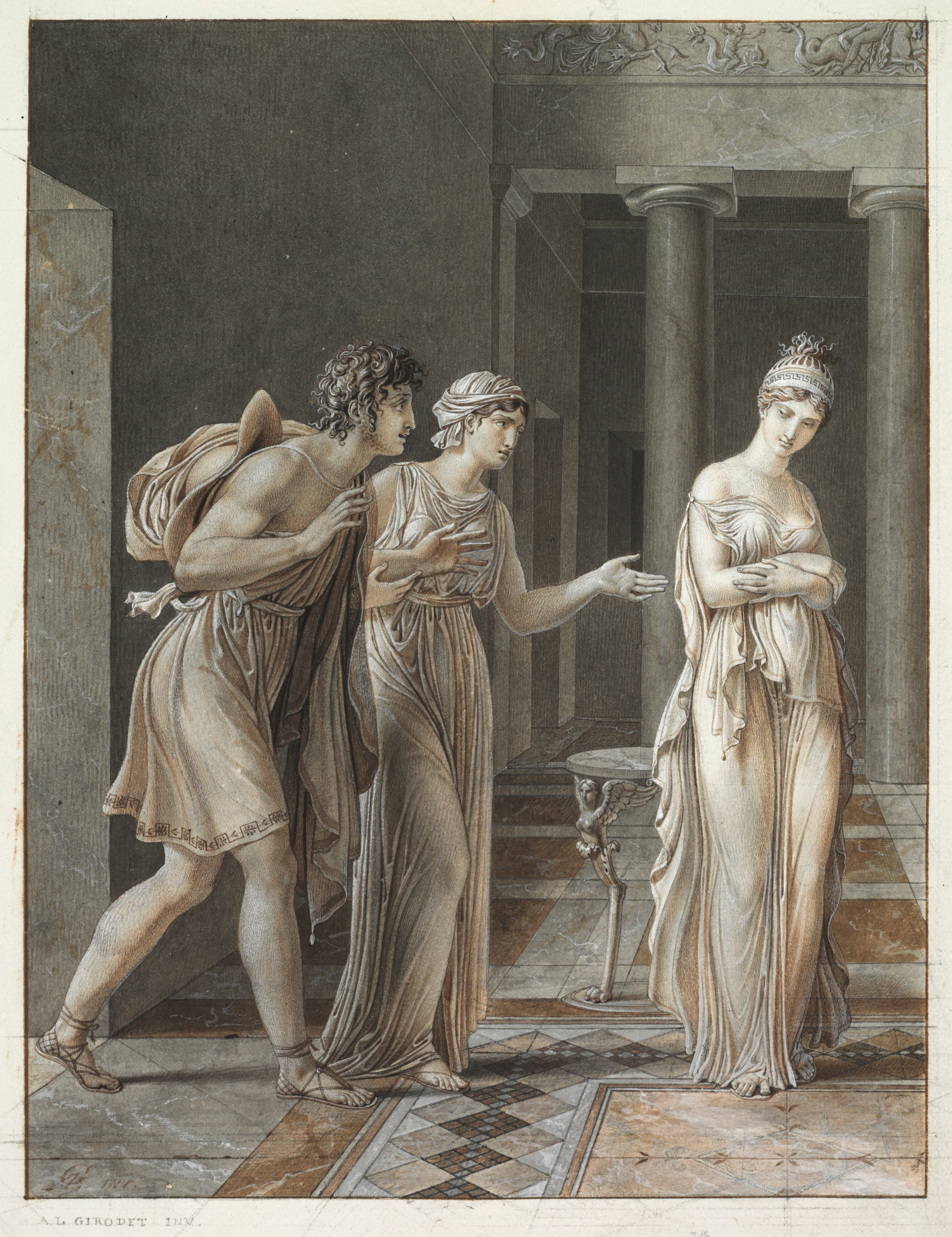
"The Meeting of Orestes and Hermione" by Girodet, 1795.

According to the Odyssey, it was ten years after the end of the Trojan War that Hermione was married to Neoptolemus. Her parents had spent eight years travelling around the Mediterranean without reaching Sparta. When Telemachus, son of Odysseus, visited Menelaus in Sparta, he found him

giving a marriage feast to his many kinsfolk for his noble son and daughter within his house. His daughter he was sending to the son of Achilles, breaker of the ranks of men, for in the land of Troy he first had promised and pledged that he would give her, and now the gods were bringing their marriage to pass.

— Odyssey IV, 3–7, translation by A. T. Murray (Loeb edition)

Shortly after settling into the domestic life, conflict arose between Hermione and Andromache (widow of Hector, prince of Troy and elder brother of Paris), the concubine Neoptolemus had obtained as a prize after the sack of Troy. Hermione blamed Andromache for her inability to become pregnant, claiming that she was casting spells on her to keep her barren. She asked her father to kill Andromache and her son while Neoptolemus was away at Delphi, but they are saved by the intervention of Peleus.

Neoptolemus did not return from Delphi. Instead, Hermione's cousin Orestes arrived to report that Neoptolemus had been killed. Reasons for his death vary. In some accounts, he started an altercation at the Temple of Apollo and was killed by a priest, the temple servants, or by the god himself. In other accounts, Orestes found him in Delphi and killed him. Whatever the cause, after Neoptolemus' death, Orestes took Hermione back to Mycenae to fulfill the original promise that Hermione would be his bride.

Hermione and Orestes were married, and she gave birth to his heir Tisamenus. It is said that Orestes also married his half-sister Erigone, daughter of Clytemnestra and Aegisthus, though it is not clear if this happened after Hermione's death or if her marriage to Orestes ended for some other reason.

Hermione eventually joined her parents in Elysium. A scholiast for Nemean X says that, according to Ibycus, Hermione married Diomedes after his apotheosis and that he now lives with her uncles, the Dioscuri, as an immortal god. He is elsewhere said to reside on the Isles of the Blessed, presumably with Hermione herself.

== In art and literature ==
- Ermione by Gioachino Rossini
- Andromaque by Jean Racine
- Goddess of Yesterday by Caroline B. Cooney
