= Pergamus =

Greek mythological figure

In Greek mythology, Pergamus (/ˈpɜːrɡəməs/; Ancient Greek: Πέργαμος) was the son of the warrior Neoptolemus with Andromache or Lanassa. He ruled the eponymous city of Pergamum.

== Family ==
As son of Neoptolemus and Andromache, Pergamus was the youngest brother of Molossus and Pielus. However, Pergamus is first referenced as the son of Neoptolemus and Lanassa. In this case, he was full brother to Argus, Pielus, Pandarus, Dorieus, Genous, Danae and Eurylochus. He had a grandson named Prax, who built a sanctuary to Achilles, the father of Neoptolemus, in Sparta.

== Mythology ==
Pergamus's parents both figure in the Trojan War, described in Homer's The Iliad: Neoptolemus was the son of Achilles and fought on the Greek side, while Andromache was the Trojan prince Hector's wife. After the death of both Achilles and Hector, and the fall of Troy, Neoptolemus captured the newly widowed Andromache for his concubine and went to rule in Epirus.

After the death of Neoptolemus, some sources say that Andromache returned to Asia Minor with her youngest son, Pergamus. There, he defeated King Areius of Teuthrania and took his city. In another tale, Pergamus came to Asia after Grynus, the son of Eurypylus, requested his aid. After helping Grynus defend against neighbouring kingdoms, the pair founded the cities of Pergamum and Gryneium.

The Kingdom of Pergamon (or Pergamum), while it was independent, seems to have created new mythology about Pergamus. According to them, upon traveling to Asia Minor with his mother, Pergamus killed the king of Teuthrania, renamed the capital after himself to Pergamum, and ruled as king. Andromache's descendants would include the royal family of Epirus (and thus Olympias, the mother of Alexander the Great), and Pergamus's line would include Attalus, the forefather of the Attalid rulers (although not a king himself and considered of common stock). This account is distrusted as transparently created to build a link between the Attalid dynasty, the rulers of Pergamon; and Alexander the Great, the great source of legitimacy that Hellenistic rulers sought to link to themselves. It does not appear to have been a major part of Attalid propaganda (unlike their claimed link to the hero Telephus), but at least one small heroon (shrine) in Pergamon was dedicated to Pergamos Ktistes, probably built in the 3rd century BC.

== Other uses ==
Pergamus (or Pergamos) is also the name of the citadel of Troy in Homer's Iliad.

The King James Version of the Bible uses the name "Pergamos" in Revelation 2:12 for the seat of one of the seven churches of Asia, a city that modern translations call Pergamum or Pergamon.
