= Andromache =

Wife of Hector in Greek mythology

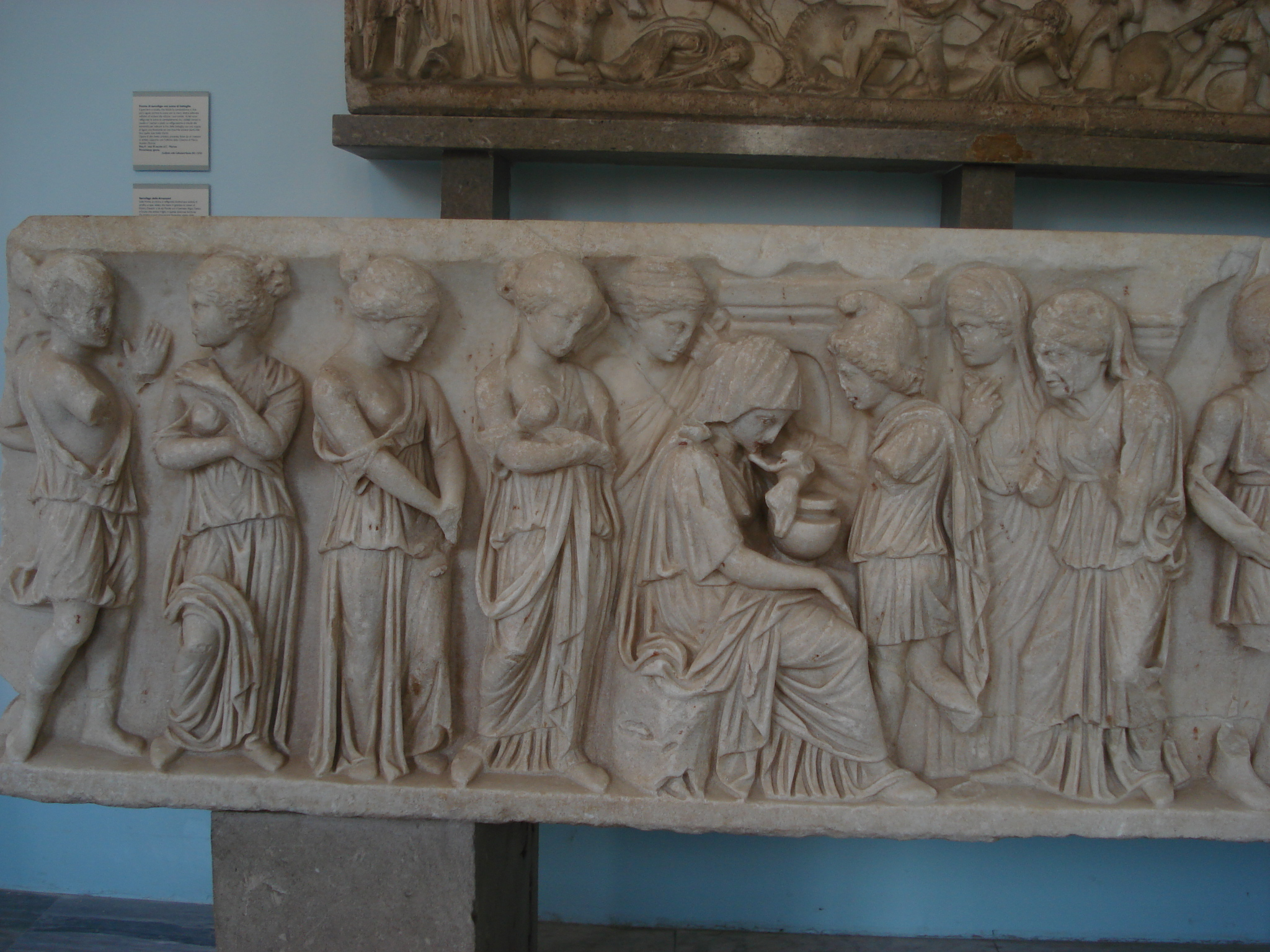
Andromache holding in her lap the urn with Hector's ashes, 2nd-century Roman sarcophagus in the Antonino Salinas Regional Archaeological Museum, Palermo.

In Greek mythology, Andromache (/ænˈdrɒməkiː/; Ancient Greek: Ἀνδρομάχη, Andromákhē [andromákʰɛ:]) was the wife of Hector, daughter of Eetion, and sister to Podes. She was born and raised in the city of Cilician Thebe, over which her father ruled. The name means "man battler", "fighter of men" or "man's battle", i.e. "courage" or "manly virtue", from the Greek stem ἀνδρ- ("man"), the compound interfix -ο- and μάχη ("battle").

Following the Trojan War, after Achilles had killed Hector and Troy had been captured and sacked by the Greeks, the Greek herald Talthybius informed her of a plan to kill Astyanax, her son by Hector, by throwing him from the city walls. This act was carried out by Neoptolemus, who then took Andromache as a concubine and Hector's brother, Helenus, as a slave. By Neoptolemus she was the mother of Molossus and according to Pausanias of Pielus, Amphialus and Pergamus. When Neoptolemus died Andromache married Helenus and became Queen of Epirus. Pausanias also implies that Helenus' son, Cestrinus, was by Andromache. In Epirus Andromache faithfully continued to make offerings at Hector's cenotaph. Andromache eventually went to live with her youngest son, Pergamus, in Pergamum, where she died of old age. Andromache was famous for her fidelity and virtue; her character represents the suffering of Trojan women during war.

== Description ==
Andromache was described by the chronicler Malalas in his account of the Chronography as "above average height, thin, well turned out, good nose, good breasts, good eyes, good brows, wooly hair, blondish hair long in back, large-featured, good neck, dimples on her cheeks, charming, quick". Meanwhile, in the account of Dares the Phrygian, she was illustrated as "...bright-eyed and fair, with a tall and beautiful body. She was modest, wise, chaste, and charming."

== Life ==
=== Families ===
Andromache was born in Cilician Thebe, a city that the Achaeans later sacked, with Achilles killing her father, Eetion, and seven brothers. After that her mother died of illness (6.425). She was taken from her father's household by Hector, who had brought countless wedding gifts (22.470–72). Thus Priam's household alone provides Andromache with familial support. In contrast to the inappropriate relationship of Paris and Helen, Hector and Andromache fit the Greek ideal of a happy and productive marriage, which heightens the tragedy of their shared misfortune. Andromache and Hector have a son together, named Scamandrius but called Astyanax by both the people of Troy and Homer. According to some accounts they had other children, including Oxynios and Laodamas.

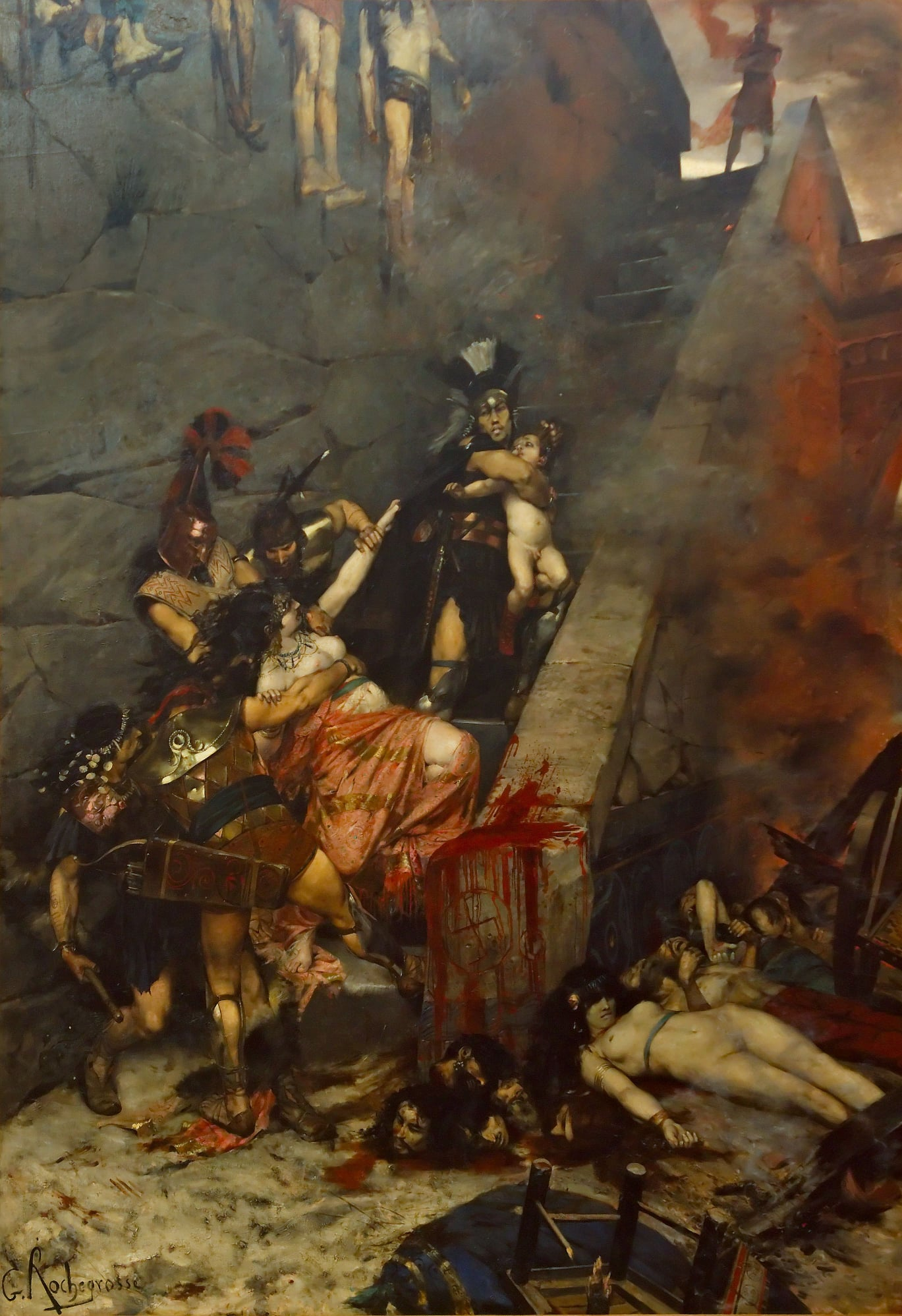
Astyanax torn from the arms of his mother Andromache to be killed by the Greek leaders. Painting by Rochegrosse.

Andromache is alone after Troy falls and her son is killed. Notably, Andromache remains unnamed in Iliad 22, referred to only as the wife of Hector (Greek alokhos), indicating the centrality of her status as Hector's wife and of the marriage itself to her identity. The Greeks divide the Trojan women as spoils of war and permanently separate them from the ruins of Troy and from one another. Andromache's fears of her life as a captive woman are realized as her family is entirely stripped from her by the violence of war, as she fulfils the fate of conquered women in ancient warfare (6.450–465). Without her familial structure, Andromache is a displaced woman who must live outside familiar and even safe societal boundaries.

=== Life after the fall of Troy ===
After Troy falls, Andromache is given as a concubine to Neoptolemus, also called Pyrrhus, son of Achilles, after her son Astyanax is murdered at the suggestion of Odysseus, who fears he will grow up to avenge his father Hector. She goes with him to Phthia, where Thetis and Peleus, the parents of Achilles, lived. Hyginus calls her son Amphialus, while Euripides gives his name as Molossus and Pausanias says that she has three children, named Molossus, Pielus and Pergamus. In Euripides' Andromache, Hermione, the wife of Neoptolemus and daughter of Helen and Menelaus, tries to kill Andromache because she believes Andromache has cursed her with infertility. In the play, Neoptolemus is killed by Orestes, who marries Hermione, and the goddess Thetis announces that Andromache will marry her ex-brother-in-law Helenus and live with him in "the land of the Molossians", where her son Molossus will start "an unbroken succession of kings who will live happy lives".

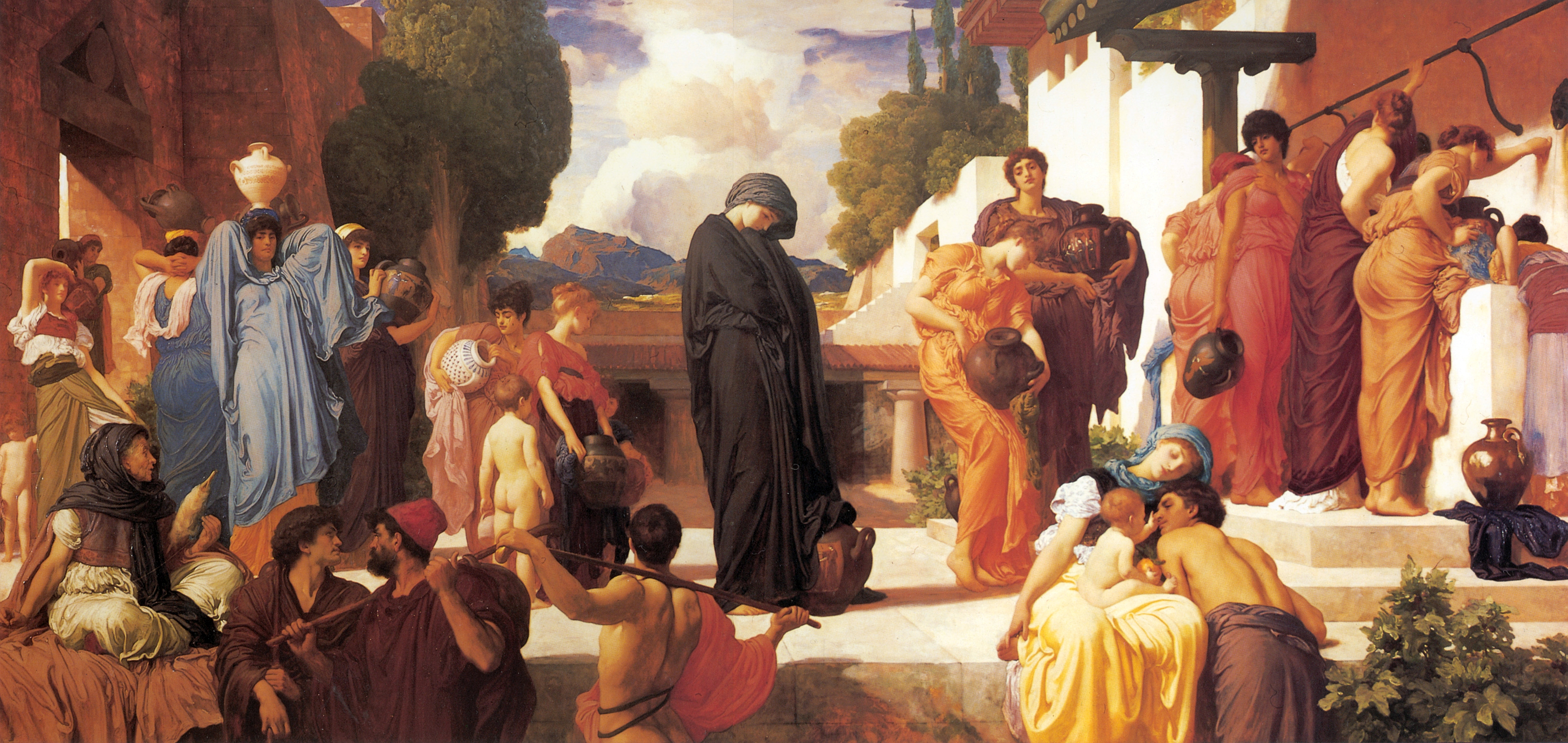
Andromache in Captivity by Frederic Leighton (c. 1886)

In Pausanias' account Helenus' son Cestrinus was the child of Andromache. Aeneas also visits Andromache and Helenus when they are living in Buthrotum, Chaonia, where Helenus gives him a prophecy and Andromache brings robes and a Phrygian cloak for Aeneas' son Ascanius and tells him he is "the sole image left to [her] of [her] Astyanax". Because Buthrotum functions as a hollow replica of the once-vibrant, razed Troy in the Aeneid, Andromache's dedications to the city—particularly Hector's grave—represent her dedication to her family and people. Andromache's actions after the fall of Troy thus reaffirm her virtuousness represented throughout Homer's Iliad and Virgil's Aeneid. Pausanias, writing in the 2nd century AD, says that "there is still a shrine [to Andromache] in the city" that was named after her son Pergamus.

== Role in society ==
=== Mourning her husband ===
Andromache's gradual discovery of her husband's death and her immediate lamentation (22.437–515) culminate the shorter lamentations of Priam and Hecuba upon Hector's death (22.405–36). In accordance with traditional customs of mourning, Andromache responds with an immediate and impulsive outburst of grief (goos) that begins the ritual lamentation. She casts away her various pieces of headdress (22.468–72) and leads the Trojan women in ritual mourning, both of which they did (22.405–36). Although Andromache adheres to the formal practice of female lamentation in Homeric epic, the raw emotion of her discovery yields a miserable beginning to a new era in her life without her husband and, ultimately, without a home. The final stage of the mourning process occurs in Iliad 24 in the formal, communal grieving (thrēnos) upon the return of Hector's body (24.703–804). In a fragment of Ennius' Andromacha, quoted by Cicero in the Tusculan Disputations (3.44–46), Andromacha sings about her loss of Hector.

=== Duties as wife ===
In Iliad 22, Andromache is portrayed as the perfect wife, weaving a cloak for her husband in the innermost chambers of the house and preparing a bath in anticipation of his return from battle (22.440–6). Here she is carrying out an action Hector had ordered her to perform during their conversation in Iliad 6 (6.490–92), and this obedience is another display of womanly virtue in Homer's eyes. However, Andromache is seen in Iliad 6 in an unusual place for the traditional housewife, standing before the ramparts of Troy (6.370–373). Traditional gender roles are breached as well, as Andromache gives Hector military advice (6.433–439). Although her behavior may seem nontraditional, hard times disrupt the separate spheres of men and women, requiring a shared civic response to the defence of the city as a whole. Andromache's sudden tactical lecture is a way to keep Hector close, by guarding a section of the wall instead of fighting out in the plains. Andromache's role as a mother, a fundamental element of her position in marriage, is emphasized within this same conversation. Their infant son, Astyanax, is also present at the ramparts as a maid tends to him. Hector takes his son from the maid, yet returns him to his wife, a small action that provides great insight into the importance Homer placed on her care-taking duties as mother (6.466–483). A bonding moment between mother and father occurs in this scene when Hector's helmet scares Astyanax, providing a moment of light relief in the story. After Hector's death in Iliad 22, Andromache's foremost concern is Astyanax's fate as a mistreated orphan (22.477–514).

== Classical treatment ==
- Homer, The Iliad VI, 390–470: XXII 437–515
- Sappho, Fragment 44
- Euripides, Andromache.
- Euripides, The Trojan Women.
- Ennius, Andromacha TrRF II 23.
- Virgil, Aeneid III, 278–355.
- Ovid, Ars Amatoria III, 777–778.
- Seneca, The Trojan Women.
- Bibliotheca III, xii, 6, Epitome V, 23; VI, 12.

== Modern treatment ==
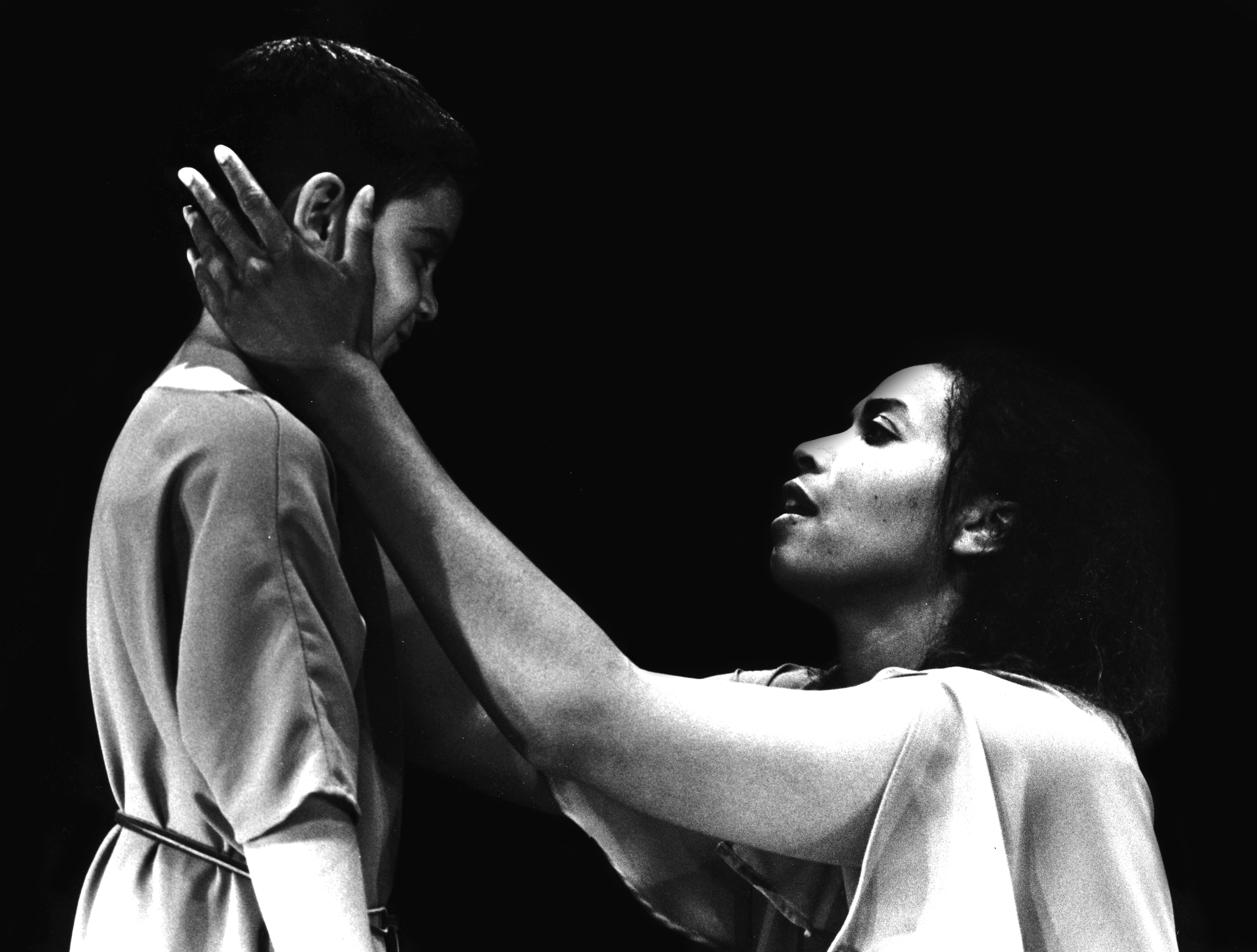
Aomawa Baker (Andromache) in Euripides' The Trojan Women, directed by Brad Mays at the ARK Theatre Company in Los Angeles, 2003

Andromache is the subject of a tragedy by French classical playwright Jean Racine (1639–1699), entitled Andromaque, and a minor character in Shakespeare's Troilus and Cressida. "The Andromache" is referenced in The Duc De L'Omelette written by Edgar Allan Poe in published in 1832. In 1857, she also importantly appears in Baudelaire's poem, "Le Cygne", in Les Fleurs du Mal. Andromache is the subject of a 1932 opera by German composer Herbert Windt and also a lyric scena for soprano and orchestra by Samuel Barber. She was portrayed by Vanessa Redgrave in the 1971 film version of Euripides' The Trojan Women, and by Saffron Burrows in the 2004 film Troy. She also appears as a character in David Gemmell's Troy series. In the 2018 TV miniseries Troy: Fall of a City, she was portrayed by Chloe Pirrie. Andromache is one of the main characters of the 2023 fictional retelling of Troy, Horses of Fire by A.D. Rhine (pseudonym of Ashlee Cowles and Danielle Stinson).
