= Molossus (son of Neoptolemus) =

Greek mythological figure

In Greek mythology, Molossus (Ancient Greek: Μολοσσός, romanized: Molossós) was the son of Neoptolemus and Andromache. He was the eponymous founder of the Molossians, an ancient Greek tribe that inhabited the region of Epirus located in northwestern Greece. Molossus had two brothers, Pielus and Pergamus (the latter named after the citadel of Troy), who were also sons of Neoptolemus and Andromache.
