= Philoctetes (disambiguation) =

Philoctetes is a figure in Greek mythology.

Philoctetes may also refer to:

- Philoctetes (Aeschylus play)
- Philoctetes (Euripides play)
- Philoctetes (Sophocles play)
- Philoctetes, the trainer of heroes from Disney's Hercules (1997 film)
