= Returns from Troy =

Greek myths about the warriors' voyages home

In Greek mythology, the Returns from Troy are the stories of how the Greek leaders returned after their victory in the Trojan War. Many Achaean heroes did not return to their homes, but died or founded colonies outside the Greek mainland. The most famous returns are those of Odysseus, whose wanderings are narrated in the Odyssey, and Agamemnon, whose murder at the hands of his wife Clytemnestra was portrayed in Greek tragedy. The part of the Epic Cycle focused on these stories is called the Nostoi.

== The sack of Troy ==
The Achaeans entered the city using the Trojan Horse and slew the slumbering population. Priam and his surviving sons and grandsons were killed. Antenor, who had earlier offered hospitality to the Achaean embassy that asked the return of Helen of Troy and had advocated so was spared, along with his family by Menelaus and Odysseus. Aeneas took his father on his back and fled. He was left alone because of his piety. The city was razed and the temples were destroyed.

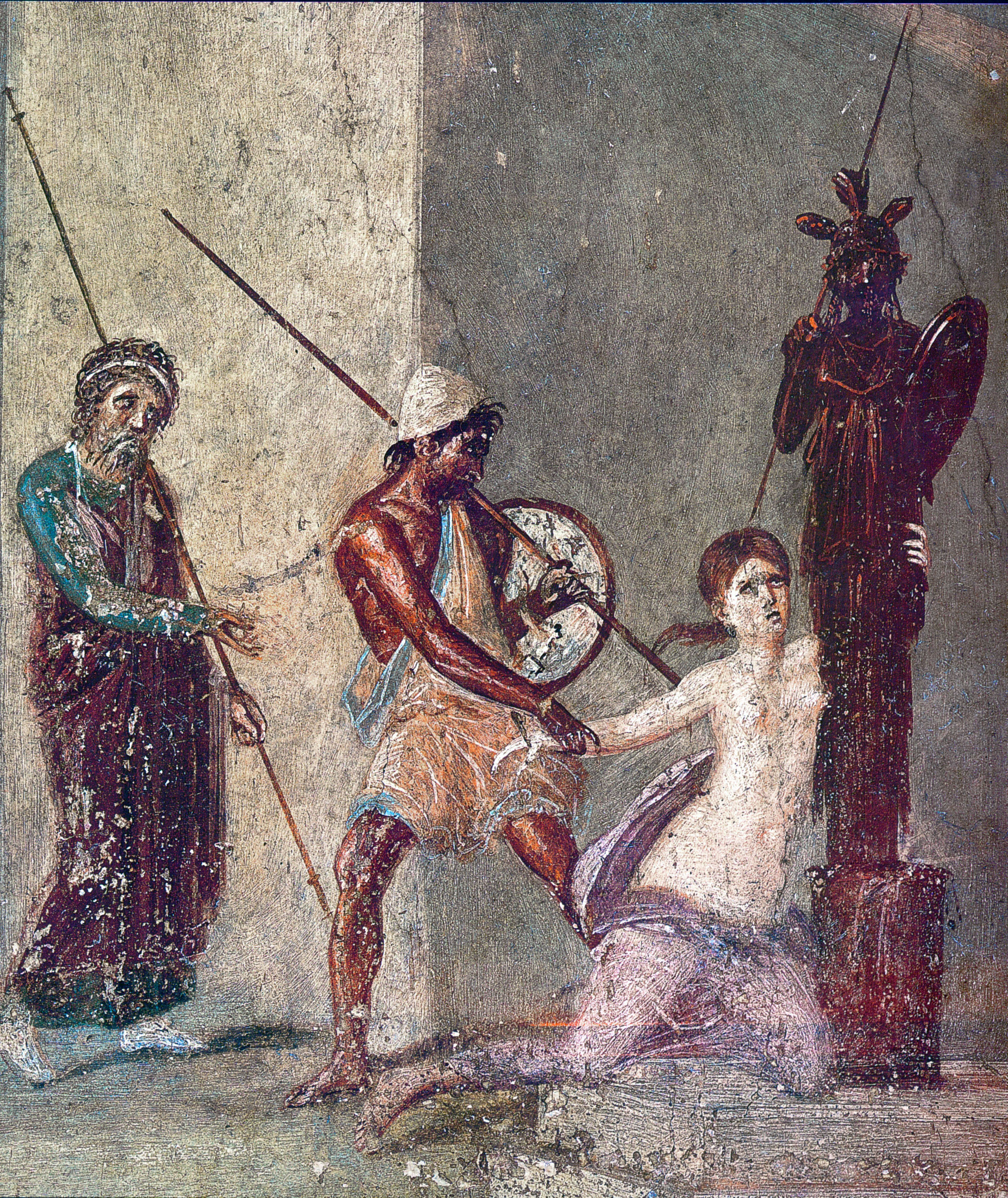
Scene from the Trojan War: Cassandra clings to the Palladium, the wooden cult image of Athene, while Ajax the Lesser is about to drag her away in front of her father Priam (standing on the left). Fresco from the atrium of the Casa del Menandro (I 10, 4) in Pompeii.

Of the women of the royal family, Locrian Ajax violated Cassandra on Athena's altar while she was clinging to her statue, which since looks upward. She was awarded to Agamemnon. Neoptolemus got Andromache, wife of Hector and Odysseus took Priam's widow Hecuba (known in Greek as Hecabe). The ghost of Achilles appeared before the survivors of the war, demanding that the Trojan princess Polyxena be sacrificed before anybody could leave, as either part of his spoil or because she had betrayed him. Neoptolemus did so.

== The Returns ==
News of Troy's fall quickly reached the Achaean kingdoms through phryctoria, a semaphore system used in ancient Greece. A fire signal lit at Troy was seen at Lemnos, relayed to Athos, then to the look-out towers of Macistus on Euboea, across the Euripus straight to Messapion, then to Mount Cithaeron, Mount Aegiplanctus and finally to Mount Arachneus, where it was seen by the people of Mycenae, including Clytaemnestra.

But though the message was brought fast and with ease, the heroes were not to return this way. The gods were thought to be very angry over the destruction of their temples and other sacrilegious acts by the Achaeans and decided that most would not return. A storm struck the returning fleet off Tenos island. Also Nauplius, in revenge for the murder of his son Palamedes by Odysseus, set up false lights at Cape Caphereus (also known today as Cavo D'Oro, on Euboea) and many were shipwrecked.

- Agamemnon had made it back to his kingdom with Cassandra in his possession after some stormy weather. He and Cassandra were slain by Aegisthus (in the oldest versions of the story) or by Clytemnestra or by both of them. Electra and Orestes later avenged their father, but Orestes was the one who was chased by the Furies. See below for further details.
- Nestor, who had the best conduct in Troy and did not take part in the looting, was the only hero who had a good, fast and safe return. Those of his army that survived the war also safely reached home with him.

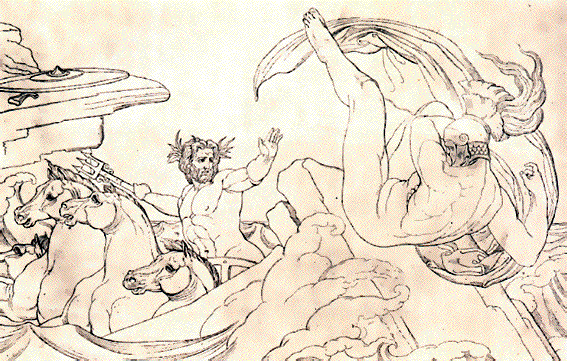
Poseidon smites Ajax by Bonaventura Genelli (1798–1868)

- Locrian Ajax, who had endured more of the wrath of the gods than the others, never returned home. His ship was wrecked by a storm sent by Athena, who borrowed one of Zeus' thunderbolts and tore it to pieces. The crew managed to land on a rock, but Poseidon smote it and the Lesser Ajax fell in the sea and drowned after he boasted that even the gods could not kill him. He was buried by Thetis on Myconos or Delos.
- The archer Teucer (son of Telamon and half-brother of the other Ajax) stood trial by his father for his brother's death. He was acquitted of responsibility but found guilty of negligence because he did not return his dead body or his arms. He was disowned and was not allowed back on Salamis Island. He left with his army (who took their wives) and was at sea near Phreattys in the Peiraeus, where he later founded Salamis on Cyprus. The Athenians later created a political myth that his son left his kingdom to Theseus' sons (and not to Megara).
- Neoptolemus, following Helenus' advice (who accompanied him) traveled over land, always accompanied by Andromache. He met Odysseus and they buried Achilles' teacher Phoenix on the land of the Ciconians. Then they conquered the land of the Molossians (the Epirus) and had a child by Andromache, Molossus, to whom he later gave the throne. Thus the kings of the Epirus claimed to be descended from Achilles, as did Alexander the Great, whose mother was of that royal house (Alexander and the kings of Macedon also claimed descent from Hercules). Helenus founded a city in Molossia and inhabited it, and Neoptolemus gave him his mother Deidamia as wife. After Peleus died, he succeeded to Phtia's throne as well. He had a feud with Orestes, son of Agamemon, over Menelaus' daughter Hermione, and he was killed at Delphi, where he was buried. In Roman myths, the kingdom of Phtia was taken over by Helenus, who married Andromache. They offered hospitality to other Trojan refugees, including Aeneas who paid a visit there during his wanderings.
- Diomedes was first thrown by a storm on the coast of Lycia, where he was to be sacrificed to Ares by King Lycus. Lycus' daughter Callirrhoe took pity upon him, and assisted him in escaping. Then he accidentally landed in Attica at Phalerum. The Athenians, unaware that they were allies, attacked them. Many were killed and the Palladium was taken by Demophon. He finally landed at Argos, where his wife Aegialia was committing adultery and, in disgust, left for Aetolia. According to Roman traditions, he had some adventures and founded a colony in Italy.
- Philoctetes, because of a sedition, was driven from his city by a revolt and emigrated to Italy, where he founded the cities of Petilia, Old Crimissa, and Chone, between Croton and Thurii. After making war on the Leucanians, he founded there a sanctuary of Apollo the Wanderer, to whom also he dedicated his bow.
- According to Homer, Idomeneus reached his house safe and sound. Another tradition was formed later. After the war, his ship ran into a horrible storm. He promised Poseidon that he would sacrifice the first living thing he saw when he returned home if the god would save his ship and crew. The first living thing was his son, whom Idomeneus duly sacrificed. The gods were angry at the sacrifice of his own son and they unleashed a plague on Crete. His people sent him into exile to Calabria in Italy, and then Colophon in Asia Minor, where he died.

Among the lesser Achaeans, very few reached their homes.

- Guneus, leader of the Aeneanians (the exact location is unknown but is believed to be in the Epirus), went to Libya and settled near the Cinyps river.
- Antiphus, son of Thessalus from Cos, settled in Pelasgiotis and renamed it Thessaly after his father Thessalus.
- Pheidippus, who had led an army from Cos, settled on Andros, Agapenor from Arcadia settled in Cyprus and founded Paphos.
- Prothous from Magnesia settled in Crete.
- Menestheus, king of Athens, became king of Melos.
- Theseus' descendants ruled Athens for four more generations.
- The army of Elephenor (who had died in front of Troy) settled in the Epirus and founded Apollonia.
- Tlepolemus, king of Rhodes, was driven by the winds and settled in the Balearic islands.
- Podalirius, following the instructions of the oracle at Delphi, settled in Caria.

=== House of Atreus ===
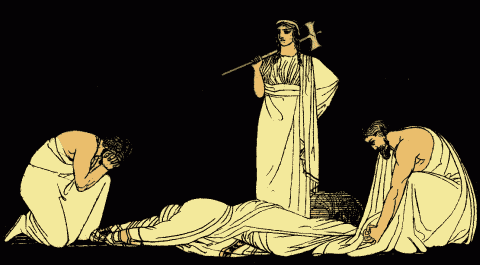
The murder of Agamemnon, in an 1879 illustration from Alfred Church's Stories from the Greek Tragedians

According to the Odyssey, Menelaus's fleet was blown by storms to Crete and Egypt where they were unable to sail away because the wind was calm. Only 5 of his ships survived. Menelaus had to catch Proteus, a shape-shifting sea god to find out what sacrifices to which gods he would have to make to guarantee safe passage. Proteus told Menelaus that he was destined for Elysium (the Fields of the Blessèd) after his death. Menelaus returned to Sparta with Helen 8 years after he had left Troy.

Agamemnon returned home with Cassandra to Mycenae. His wife Clytemnestra (Helen's sister) was having an affair with Aegisthus, son of Thyestes, Agamemnon's cousin who had conquered Argos before Agamemnon himself retook it. Possibly out of vengeance for the death of Iphigenia, Clytemnestra plotted with her lover to kill Agamemnon. Cassandra foresaw this murder, and warned Agamemnon, but he disregarded her. He was killed, either at a feast or in his bath according to different versions. Cassandra was also killed. Agamemnon's son Orestes, who had been away, returned and conspired with his sister Electra to avenge their father. He killed Clytemnestra and Aegisthus and succeeded to his father's throne yet he was chased by the Furies until he was acquitted by Athena.

=== The Odyssey ===
Odysseus (or Ulysses), attempting to travel home, underwent a series of trials, tribulations and setbacks that stretched his journey to ten years' time. These are detailed in Homer's epic poem the Odyssey.

At first they landed in the land of the Ciconians in Ismara. After looting the land they were driven back with many casualties. A storm off Cape Maleas drove them to uncharted waters. They landed in the land of the Lotus-eaters. There a scouting party ate from the lotus tree and forgot everything of home. Odysseus had to drag crew members back to the ship.

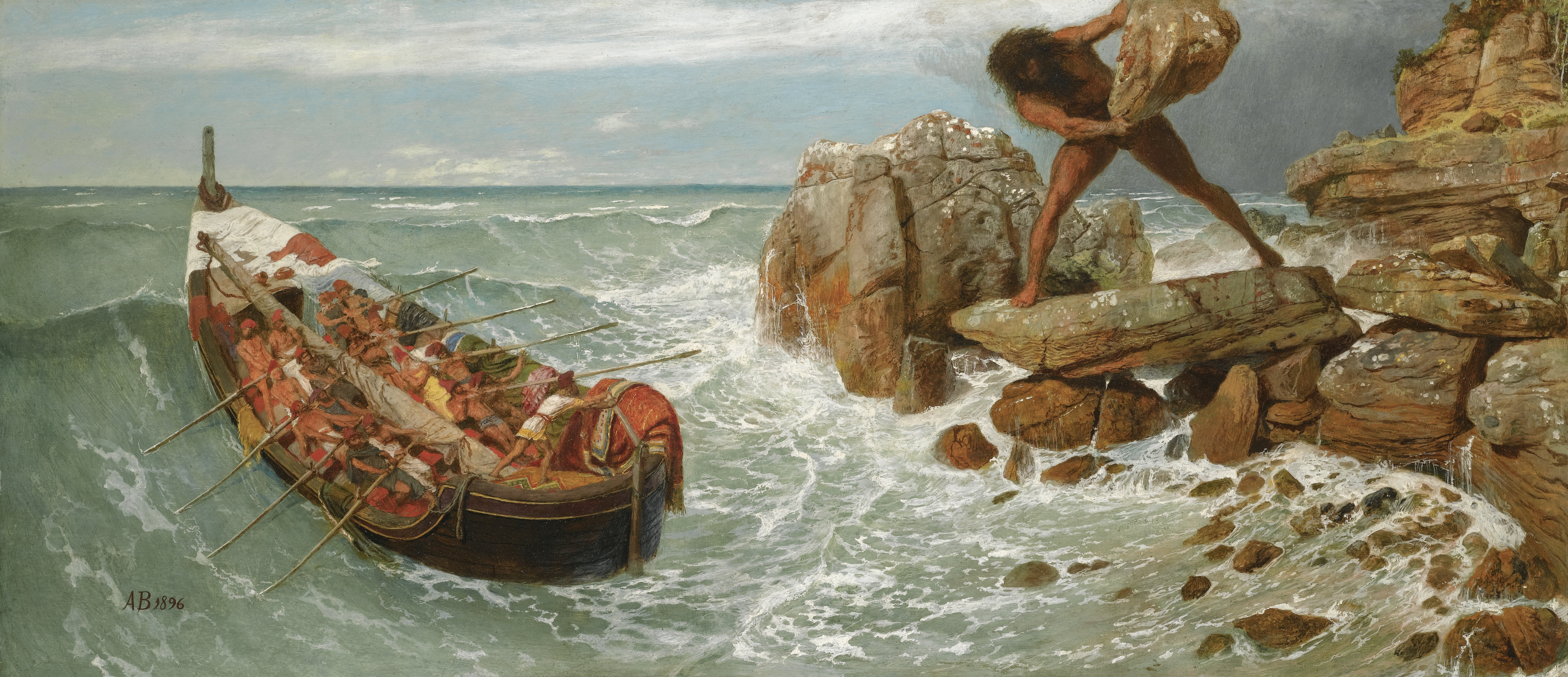
Odysseus and Polyphemus (1896) by Arnold Böcklin: Odysseus and his crew escape the Cyclops Polyphemus.

The rest then set sail and landed at the land of Polyphemus, son of Poseidon. After a few were killed by him Odysseus blinded him and managed to escape, but earned Poseidon's wrath.

They went next to the isle of Aeolus, god of winds. Odysseus was received hospitably by the Aeolus who gave him a favorable wind and a bag that contained the unfavorable wind. When Odysseus fell asleep in sight of Ithaca his crew opened the bag, and the ships were driven away.

In the next of the Laestrygonians next they neared, where the cannibalistic inhabitants sank his fleet (except Odysseus' ship) and ate the crew.

Next they landed on Circe's island, who transformed most of the crew into pigs, but Odysseus managed to force her to transform them back and left.

Odysseus wished to speak to Tiresias, so he went the river Acheron in Hades, where they performed sacrifices which allowed them to speak to the dead. They gave them advice on how to proceed. Then, he went to Circe's island again.

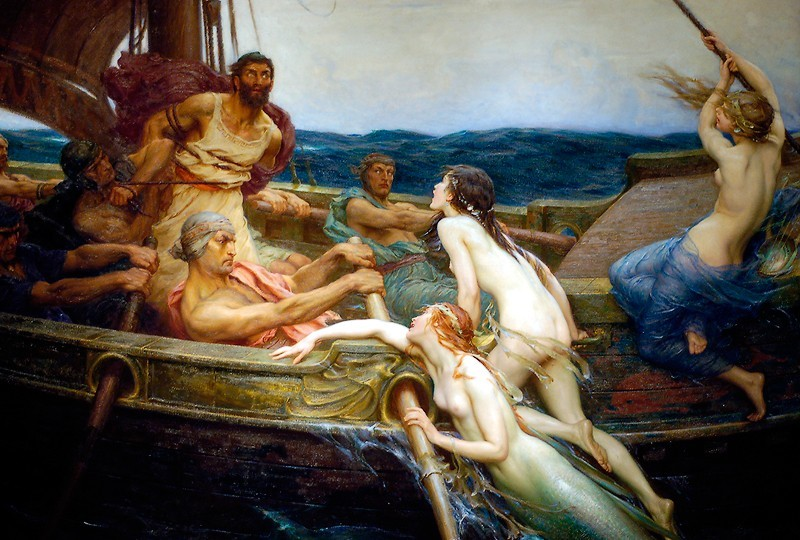
Ulysses and the Sirens (1909) by Herbert James Draper

From there he set sail through the pass of the Sirens, whose sweet singing lure sailors to their doom. He had stopped up the ears of his crew with wax, and Odysseus alone listened while tied to the mast.

Next was the pass of Scylla and Charybdis where he lost part of his ship's crew. The rest landed in the isle Thrinacia, sacred to Helios (the Sun) where he kept sacred cattle. Though Odysseus warned his men not to (as Tiresias had told him), they killed and ate some of the cattle after Zeus placed Odysseus in his sleep to test his crew. Under a threat from Helios to take the sun and shine it in the Underworld, Zeus shipwrecked the last ship and killed everyone except Odysseus.

Odysseus was washed ashore on Ogygia, where the nymph Calypso lived. She made him her lover for seven years and would not let him leave, promising him immortality if he stayed. On behalf of Athena, Zeus intervened and sent Hermes to tell Calypso to let Odysseus go.

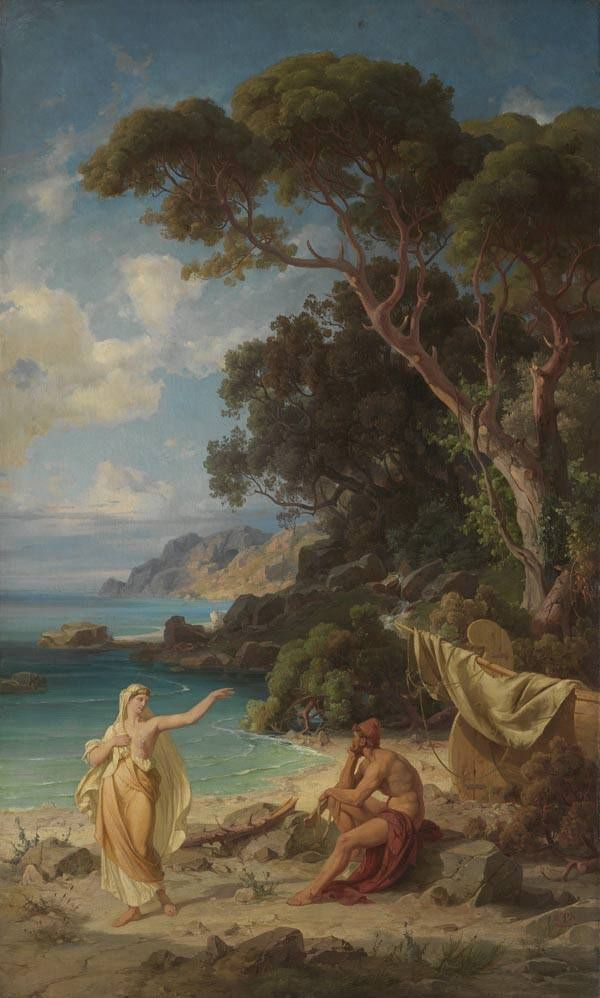
Odysseus says goodbye to Calypso (1864) by Friedrich Preller the Elder; Bavarian State Painting Collections

Odysseus left on a small raft furnished with provisions of water, wine and food by Calypso, only to be hit by a storm and washed up on the island of Scheria and found by Nausicaa, daughter of King Alcinous and Queen Arete of the Phaeacians, who entertained him well and escorted him to Ithaca. On the tenth year of sailing, the twentieth year away from home, he arrived at his home on Ithaca.

There Odysseus traveled disguised as an old beggar by Athena he was recognized by his dog Argus, who died in his lap. Then he discovered his wife Penelope had been faithful to him all these years despite the countless suitors, including Antinous and Eurymachus, that were eating and spending his property all these years. With his son Telemachus' help and that of Athena and Eumaeus the swineherd, killed all of them except Medon, who had been polite to Penelope, and Phemius, a local singer who had only been forced to help the suitors against Penelope. Penelope tested him by saying they'd move his immovable bed, which correctly Odysseus pointed out couldn't be done, and he forgave her. On the next day the suitor's relatives, led by Eupeithes, the father of the suitor Antinous, tried to take revenge on him but they were stopped by Athena.

Years later Odysseus' son by Circe, Telegonus came from the sea and plundered the island thinking it was Corcyra. Odysseus and Telemachus, defended their city and Telegonus accidentally killed his father with the spine of a stingray. He brought the body back to Aeaea and took Penelope and Telemachus with him. Circe made them immortal and married Telemachus, while Telegonus made Penelope his wife.[183] This is where the tale of the Trojan War for Greek mythology ends. According to a Roman tradition Odysseus did not die this way: when old he took a ship to sea and, crossing the Pillars of Hercules he discovered the estuary of the Tagus river and found there the city of Lisbon.

== See also ==
- Aeneid
- Founding of Rome
- Nostoi
