= The Man in the Maze =

The Man in the Maze may refer to:

- The Man in the Maze (novel), a 1969 novel by Robert Silverberg
- The Man in the Maze (film), a 2011 film

== See also ==
- I'itoi or Man in the Maze, a mischievous creator god in the tradition of the O'odham people
