= Krimisa =

City in Magna Graecia

Coordinates: 39.3965°N 17.1467°E

Krimisa, Crimisa or Crimissa was an ancient town, probably originating in the 7th century BC, situated in modern Calabria in the region of Punta Alice. It was inhabited by an indigenous people assimilated by the Greeks.

The sanctuary of Apollo Aleus was closely associated with Crimissa and has been excavated.

== Location ==
Even though the identification remains uncertain, scholars are inclined to believe that the city stood in Punta Alice, near the present Cirò Marina.

== Origin and myth ==
According to various mythographical accounts, not always uniform and coherent, of Strabo, Pseudo-Apollodorus, Lycophron and Pseudo-Aristotle, the Greek hero Philoctetes reached these places on his way back from the Trojan War, together with the Rhodians under Tlepolemus. He colonized the promontory of Crimisa and founded a city of the same name. Topographically, Krimisa was located in a lower area as compared to Chone, city of the Choni, now Cirò.

Philoctetes was believed to have also founded Petelia (Strongoli) and Macalla. He also had a sanctuary dedicated to Apollo Aleus, where he laid his bow and arrows received as a gift from Heracles. Then, rushing to the aid of his Rhodian allies, he died fighting against barbaric natives. On his tomb erected near the river Sybaris was subsequently built a temple where he was honoured with sacrifices.

== History ==
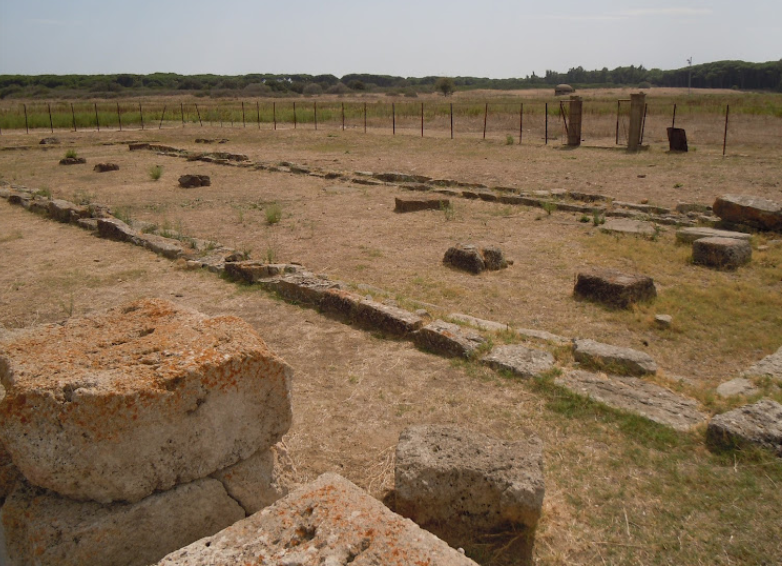
Sanctuary of Apollo Aleus

The site dates to the 7th century BC. During the Classical period the city was thoroughly Hellenized and remained that way until the Roman era.

The sanctuary of Apollo Aleus had 4 phases, the oldest being "Greek-Italic" probably in wood, from 7th century until the end of the 6th century BC. The monumental rebuilding of the sanctuary using Greek architecture took place from the first half of the 6th century BC.

The second phase dates from the mid-5th to the end of the 4th century BC, when the acrolith of Apollo (440-420 BC) was created and another Temple of Demeter, near the Alice crossroads, was built. It is represented most notably by architectural terracotta. This temple was very elongated (16.15 x 38.10 m stylobate) with 7 x 15 columns. The base of the wall of the cella and the bases of the central colonnade and the pillars inside the adyton are preserved. The construction technique was common to many archaic buildings: on a light foundation a plinth was made up of two rows of freshly rough-hewn limestone blocks, bound by clay and limestone flakes; the walls must have been made of mud bricks and wood, shown by the modest dimensions of the foundations and the absence of stone fragments.

The third, Hellenistic, phase of the mid-4th and 3rd centuries, coincides with the emergence of the Bruttii. In the first decades of the 3rd century BC the archaic temple was demolished and its most sacred relics (acrolith and votive offering) buried in the new foundations which incorporate the old structure and a larger Doric peripteral temple was erected by the Bruttii in limestone, surrounded by 8 x 19 columns. The temple was famous until the devastations of Pyrrhus after which its decline began, which saw it sacked and destroyed perhaps already towards the end of the 3rd and 2nd c. BC.

The fourth phase from the end of the Second Punic War (202 BC) until the fall of the Roman Empire (476 AD) had a reduced attendance of visitors.

== Archaeology ==
The famous Italian archaeologist Paolo Orsi worked in the area where the ancient Krimisa is presumed to have been located, and made several discoveries during excavations carried out between 1924 and 1929.

Subsequent excavation campaigns at the temple of Apollo Aleo were carried out between 1970 and 1990.

== Archaeological finds ==
In the Museo Civico Archeologico of Cirò Marina, located in an 18th-century building of Palazzo Porti and in Castello Sabatini, are exhibited several artifacts found in the area of the sanctuary of Apollo Aleus: a capital, several architectural items, a terracotta mask, a pedestal, fragments of a bronze statue, fragments of a wig made of bronze, bronze coins, figurines.

In the Museo Archeologico Nazionale of Crotone finds from the sanctuary of Apollo Aleus at Cirò Punto Alice include: some Doric capitals of the temple, an antefix with a disc portraying a Gorgon from the acroterium, votive tablets, a matrix of an antefix, and fragments of an archaic statuette of a young man in limestone. There is no lack of captions illustrating the site and photos of the famous acrolith.

In the Museo Nazionale della Magna Grecia, more precious items include:

- A stupendous head, hands and feet of a marble statue of Apollo. The statue in question apparently was an acrolith (i.e. a statue of which only the head and limbs are made of marble, while the body was made of wood or simply a scaffold then covered at all points). The head, which shows the influence of Pheidias, is made of white marble and has holes around the forehead that originally supported a wig made of bronze or a metal crown. It is dated to 440 BC.
- a small gold idol, which Paolo Orsi believed represented Apollo.
