= Orphism =

Set of ancient Greek and Hellenistic religious beliefs

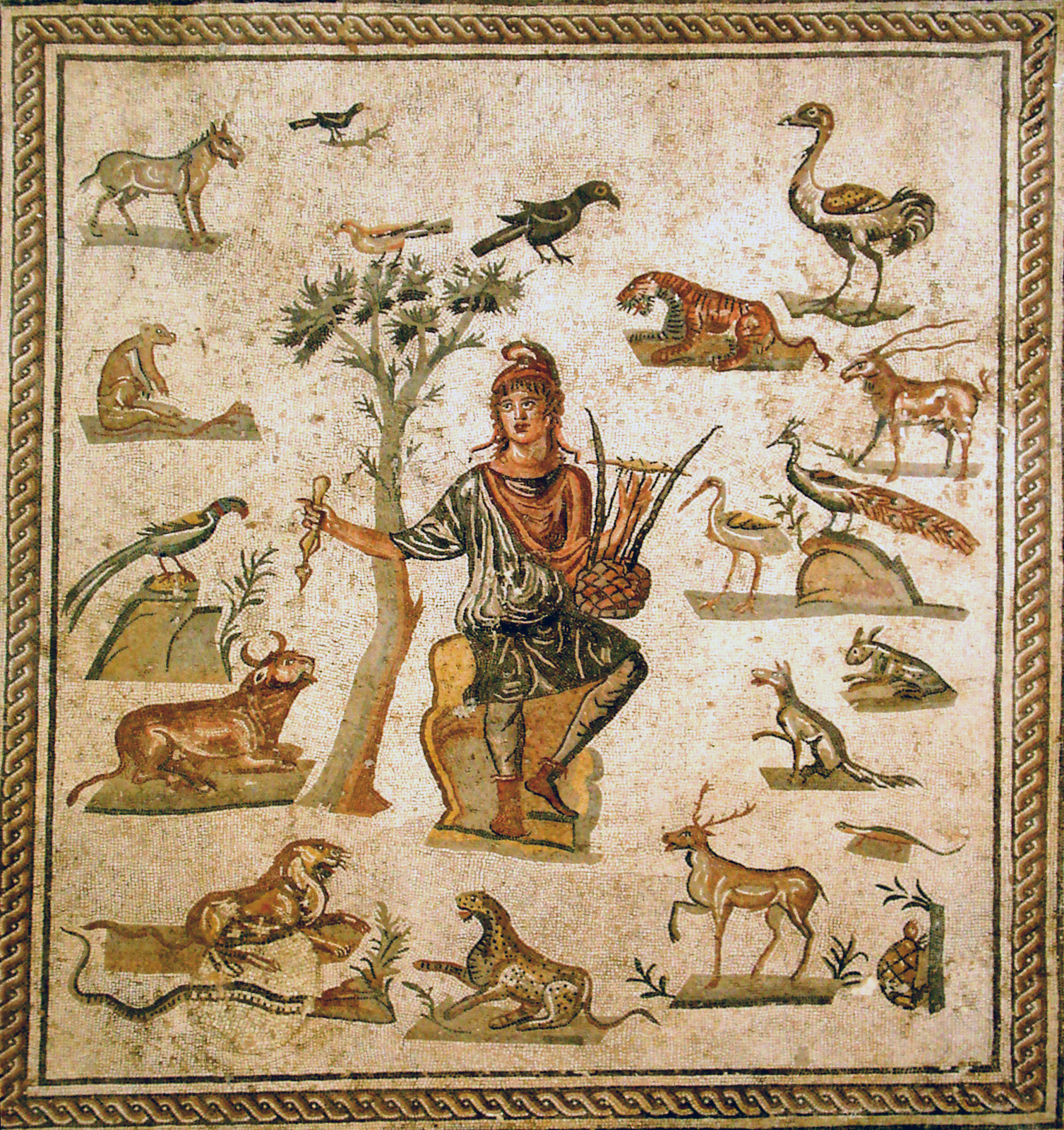
Orphic mosaics were found in many late-Roman villas.

Orphism is the name given to a set of religious beliefs and practices originating in the ancient Greek and Hellenistic world, associated with literature ascribed to the mythical poet Orpheus, who descended (katabasis) into the Greek underworld and returned. Orphism has been described as a reform of the earlier Dionysian religion, involving a re-interpretation or re-reading of the myth of Dionysus and a re-ordering of Hesiod's Theogony, based in part on pre-Socratic philosophy.

The suffering and death of the god Dionysus at the hands of the Titans has been considered the central myth of Orphism. According to this myth, the infant Dionysus is killed, torn apart, and consumed by the Titans. In retribution, Zeus strikes the Titans with a thunderbolt, turning them to ash. From these ashes, humanity is born. According to some conceptions of Orphism, this myth is the basis of the Orphic belief that humanity possesses a dual nature: body (Ancient Greek: σῶμα, romanized: sôma), inherited from the Titans, and a divine spark or soul (Ancient Greek: ψυχή, romanized: psukhḗ), inherited from Dionysus. In order to achieve salvation from the Titanic, material existence, one had to be initiated into the Dionysian mysteries and undergo teletē, a ritual purification and reliving of the suffering and death of the god. The uninitiated (Ancient Greek: ἀμύητος, romanized: amúētos), they believed, would be reincarnated indefinitely.

== History ==
Orphism is named after the legendary poet-hero Orpheus, who was said to have originated the Mysteries of Dionysus. However, Orpheus was more closely associated with Apollo than to Dionysus in the earliest sources and iconography. According to some versions of his mythos, he was the son of Apollo, and during his last days, he shunned the worship of other gods and devoted himself to Apollo alone.

=== Origins ===
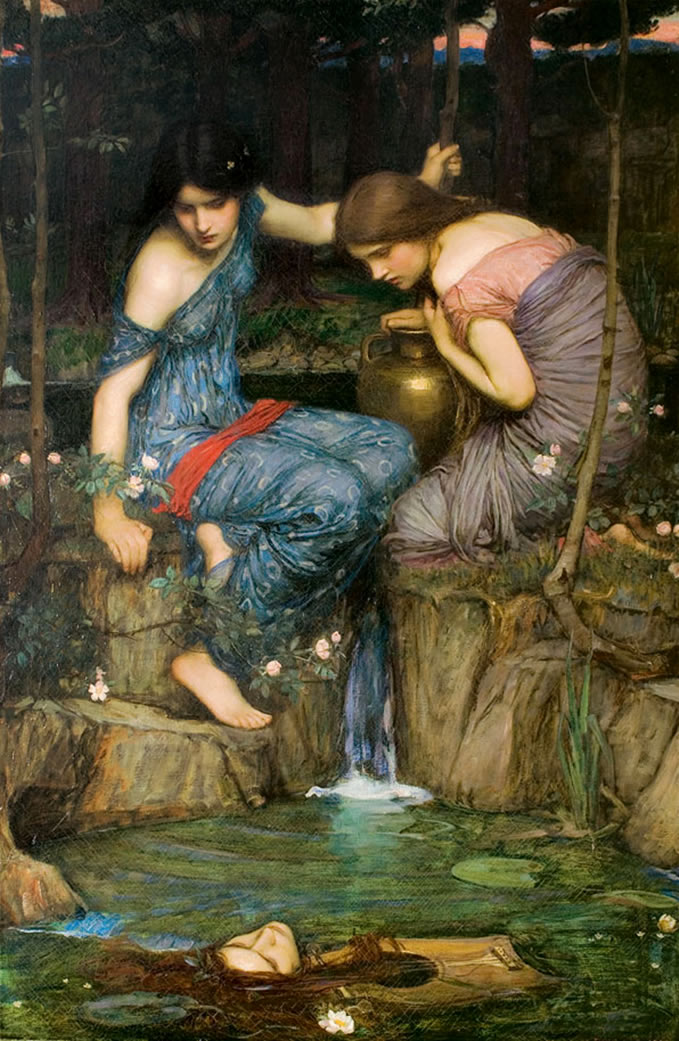
Nymphs Finding the Head of Orpheus (1900) by John William Waterhouse

Poetry containing distinctly Orphic beliefs has been traced back to the 6th century BC or at least 5th century BC, and graffiti of the 5th century BC apparently refers to "Orphics". The Derveni papyrus allows Orphic mythology to be dated to the end of the 5th century BC, and it is probably even older. Orphic views and practices are attested as by Herodotus, Euripides, and Plato. Plato refers to "Orpheus-initiators" (Ὀρφεοτελεσταί), and associated rites, although how far "Orphic" literature in general related to these rites is not certain.

=== Relationship to Pythagoreanism ===
Orphic views and practices have parallels to elements of Pythagoreanism, and various traditions hold that the Pythagoreans or Pythagoras himself authored early Orphic works; alternately, later philosophers believed that Pythagoras was an initiate of Orphism. The extent to which one movement may have influenced the other remains controversial. Some scholars maintain that Orphism and Pythagoreanism began as separate traditions which later became confused and conflated due to a few similarities. Others argue that the two traditions share a common origin and can even be considered a single entity, termed "Orphico-Pythagoreanism."

The belief that Pythagoreanism was a subset or direct descendant of Orphic religion existed by late antiquity, when Neoplatonist philosophers took the Orphic origin of Pythagorean teachings at face value. Proclus wrote:

all that Orpheus transmitted through secret discourses connected to the mysteries, Pythagoras learnt thoroughly when he completed the initiation at Libethra in Thrace, and Aglaophamus, the initiator, revealed to him the wisdom about the gods that Orpheus acquired from his mother Calliope.

In the fifteenth century, the Neoplatonic Greek scholar Constantine Lascaris (who found the poem Argonautica Orphica) considered a Pythagorean Orpheus.

Study of early Orphic and Pythagorean sources, however, is more ambiguous concerning their relationship, and authors writing closer to Pythagoras' own lifetime never mentioned his supposed initiation into Orphism, and in general regarded Orpheus himself as a mythological figure. Despite this, even these authors of the 5th and 4th centuries BC noted a strong similarity between the two doctrines. In fact, some claimed that rather than being an initiate of Orphism, Pythagoras was actually the original author of the first Orphic texts. Specifically, Ion of Chios claimed that Pythagoras authored poetry which he attributed to the mythical Orpheus, and Epigenes, in his On Works Attributed to Orpheus, attributed the authorship of several influential Orphic poems to notable early Pythagoreans, including Cercops. According to Cicero, Aristotle also claimed that Orpheus never existed, and that the Pythagoreans ascribed some Orphic poems to Cercon (see Cercops).

Belief in metempsychosis was common to both currents, although it also seems to contain differences. Where the Orphics taught about a cycle of grievous embodiments that could be escaped through their rites, Pythagoras seemed to teach about an eternal, neutral metempsychosis against which personal actions would be irrelevant.

The Neoplatonists regarded the theology of Orpheus, carried forward through Pythagoreanism, as the core of the original Greek religious tradition. Proclus, an influential neoplatonic philosopher, one of the last major classical philosophers of late antiquity, says

"For all the Grecian theology is the progeny of the mystic tradition of Orpheus; Pythagoras first of all learning from Aglaophemus the rites of the Gods, but Plato in the second place receiving an all-perfect science of the divinities from the Pythagoric and Orphic writings."

(trans. Thomas Taylor, 1816)

== Orphic literature ==
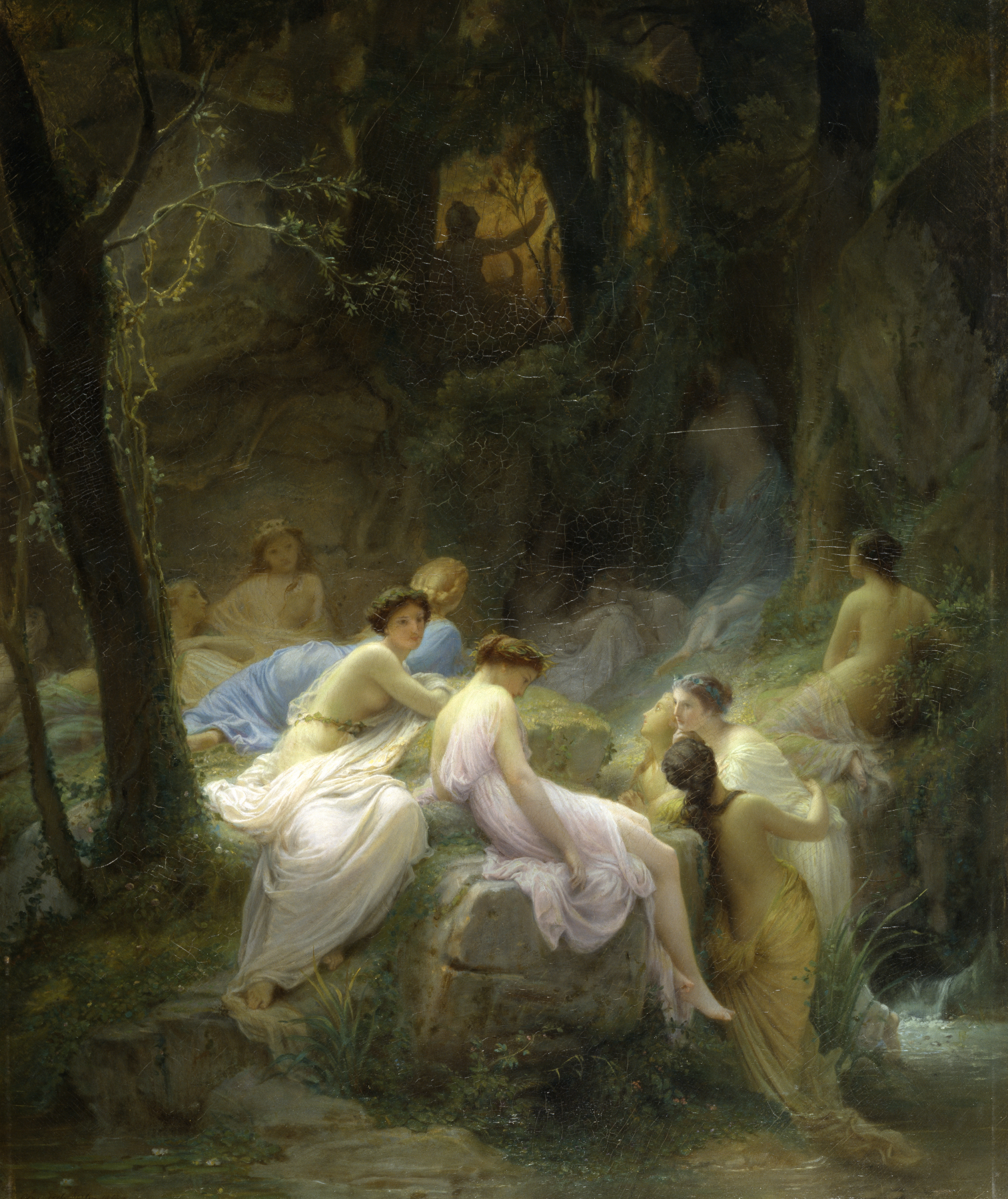
Nymphs Listening to the Songs of Orpheus (1853) by Charles Jalabert

A number of Greek religious poems in hexameters were attributed to Orpheus, though only a few such works are extant. Lost Orphic poems, which may date back as far as the sixth century BC, survive only in papyrus fragments or in quotations.

=== Theogonies ===
The Orphic theogonies are works which present accounts of the origin of the gods, much like the Theogony of Hesiod. These theogonies are symbolically similar to Near Eastern models.

The main story has it that Zagreus, Dionysus' previous incarnation, is the son of Zeus and Persephone. Zeus names the child as his successor, which angers his wife Hera. She instigates the Titans to murder the child. Zagreus is then tricked with a mirror and children's toys by the Titans, who shred him to pieces and consume him. Athena saves the heart and tells Zeus of the crime, who in turn hurls a thunderbolt on the Titans. The resulting soot, from which sinful mankind is born, contains the bodies of the Titans and Zagreus. The soul of man (the Dionysus part) is therefore divine, but the body (the Titan part) holds the soul in bondage. Thus, it was declared that the soul returns to a host ten times, bound to the wheel of rebirth. Following the punishment, the dismembered limbs of Zagreus were cautiously collected by Apollo who buried them in his sacred land Delphi.

There are two Orphic stories of the rebirth of Dionysus: in one it is the heart of Dionysus that is implanted into the thigh of Zeus; in the other Zeus has impregnated the mortal woman Semele, resulting in Dionysus's literal rebirth. Many of these details differ from accounts in the classical authors. Damascius says that Apollo "gathers him (Dionysus) together and brings him back up".

The Derveni papyrus, found in Derveni, Macedonia (Greece), in 1962, contains a philosophical treatise that is an allegorical commentary on an Orphic poem in hexameters, known as the Derveni Theogony. It concerned the birth of the gods, and was written in the second half of the fifth century BC. Fragments of the poem are quoted making it "the most important new piece of evidence about Greek philosophy and religion to come to light since the Renaissance". The papyrus dates to around 340 BC, during the reign of Philip II of Macedon, making it Europe's oldest surviving manuscript.

In the Eudemian Theogony (5th century BC), the first being to exist is Night (Nyx). The Rhapsodic Theogony starts with Chronos (a personification of time, separate to Zeus's father Kronos), who gives birth to Aether and Chaos, and then lays the egg from which Phanes arises. In the Hieronyman Theogony, the egg arises from soil (more specifically 'the matter out of which earth was coagulated') and water, and it is Chronos which arises from it, and gives birth to Aether, Chaos and Erebus. Then Kronos lays a new egg in Chaos, from which arises Protogonos. In the Derveni Theogony, the Night lays the egg from which Protogonos arises, he then gives birth to Ouranos and Gaia, which give birth to Kronos, himself father of Zeus, who ends up swallowing the primordial egg of Protogonos and recreating the Universe in the process.

There were also differences in how the Orphic theogonies treated Dionysos. In the Rhapsodic Theogony, Dionysos is dismembered and cooked by the Titans before Zeus struck them with lightning (mankind then arises from the soot, and Dionysos is resurrected from his preserved heart). The Derveni Papyrus is fragmentary, and the story stops without having mentioned Dionysus. The extant sources for the Hieronyman Theogony (Damascius and Athenagoras) do not mention the Titans' eating of Dionysus.

In later centuries, these versions underwent a development where Apollo's act of burying became responsible for the reincarnation of Dionysus, thus giving Apollo the title Dionysiodotes (bestower of Dionysus). Apollo plays an important part in the dismemberment myth because he represents the reverting of Encosmic Soul towards unification.

In Orphic theogonies, the primordial hermaphroditic deity Phanes is born from an egg, and he in turn creates the other gods. The egg is often depicted with the serpent-like creature, Ananke, wound about it. Phanes is the golden winged primordial being who was hatched from the shining cosmic egg that was the source of the universe.

=== Gold tablets ===
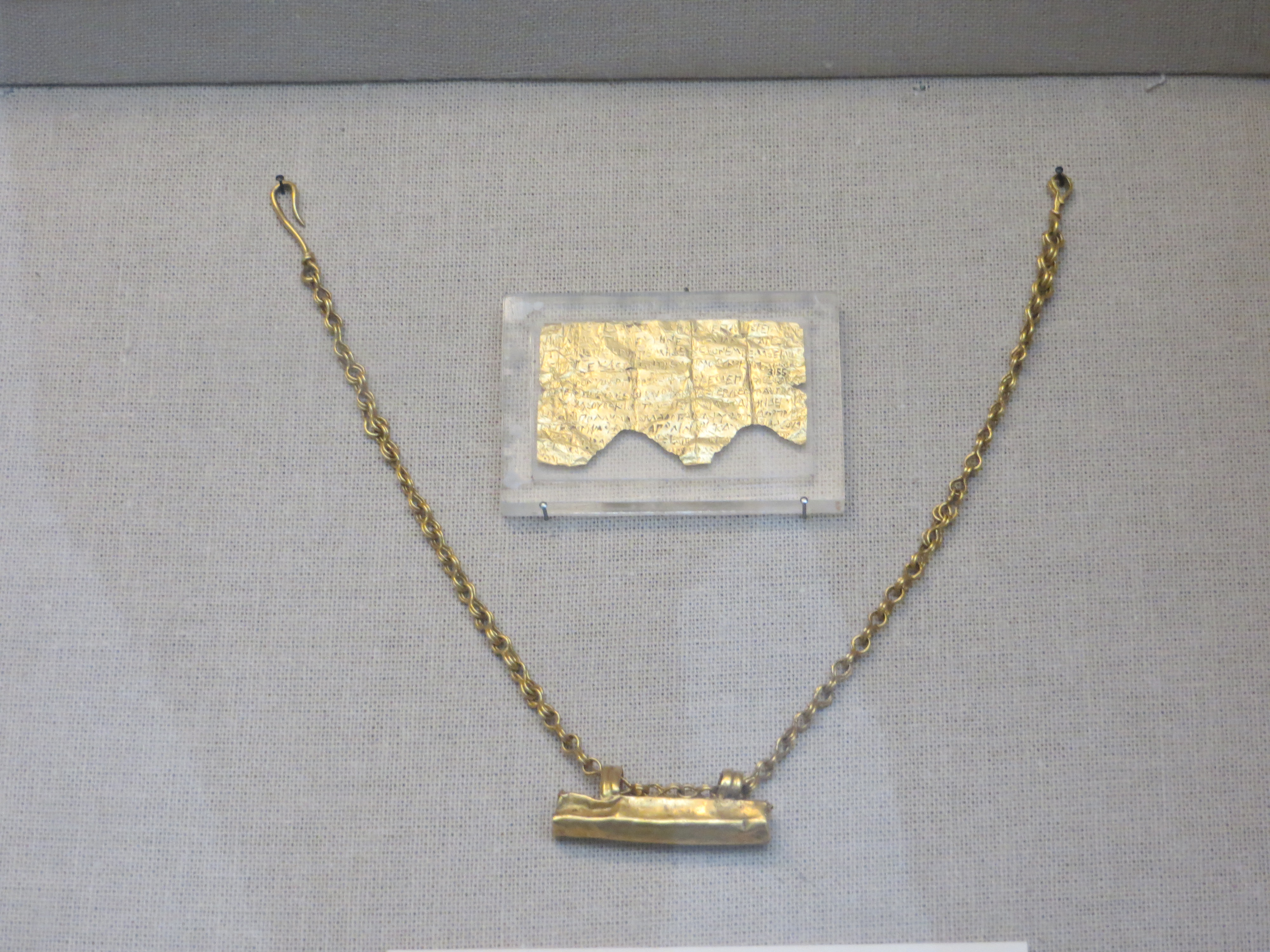
Gold orphic tablet and case found in Petelia, southern Italy (British Museum)

Surviving written fragments show a number of beliefs about the afterlife similar to those in the "Orphic" mythology about Dionysus' death and resurrection. Bone tablets found in Olbia (5th century BC) carry short and enigmatic inscriptions like: "Life. Death. Life. Truth. Dio(nysus). Orphics." The function of these bone tablets is unknown.

Gold-leaf tablets found in graves from Thurii, Hipponium, Thessaly and Crete (4th century BC and after) give instructions to the dead. Although these thin tablets are often highly fragmentary, collectively they present a shared scenario of the passage into the afterlife. When the deceased arrives in the underworld, he is expected to confront obstacles. He must take care not to drink of Lethe ("Forgetfulness"), but of the pool of Mnemosyne ("Memory"). He is provided with formulaic expressions with which to present himself to the guardians of the afterlife. As said in the Petelia tablet:

I am a son of Earth and starry sky. I am parched with thirst and am dying; but quickly grant me cold water from the Lake of Memory to drink.

Other gold leaves offer instructions for addressing the rulers of the underworld:

Now you have died and now you have come into being, O thrice happy one, on this same day. Tell Persephone that the Bacchic One himself released you.

=== Extant works ===
The Orphic Hymns are 87 hexametric poems of a shorter length composed in the Roman Imperial age.

The Orphic Argonautica (Ancient Greek: Ὀρφέως Ἀργοναυτικά) is a Greek epic poem dating from the 4th century CE of unknown authorship. It is narrated in the first person in the name of Orpheus and tells the story of Jason and the Argonauts. The narrative is basically similar to that in other versions of the story, such as the Argonautica of Apollonius Rhodius, on which it is probably based. The main differences are the emphasis on the role of Orpheus and a more mythological, less realistic technique of narration. In the Argonautica Orphica, unlike in Apollonius Rhodius, it is claimed that the Argo was the first ship ever built.

== Bibliography ==
=== Editions and translations ===
- Athanassakis, Apostolos N. Orphic Hymns: Text, Translation, and Notes. Missoula: Scholars Press for the Society of Biblical Literature, 1977. ISBN 978-0-89130-119-6
- Bernabé, Albertus (ed.), Orphicorum et Orphicis similium testimonia et fragmenta. Poetae Epici Graeci. Pars II. Fasc. 1. Bibliotheca Teubneriana, München/Leipzig: K.G. Saur, 2004. ISBN 3-598-71707-5
- Kern, Otto. Orphicorum fragmenta, Berolini apud Weidmannos, 1922.
- Graf, Fritz; Johnston, Sarah (2007). Ritual Texts for the Afterlife: Orpheus and the Bacchic Gold Tablets. Routledge. ISBN 978-0-415-41550-7.

=== References ===
- Betegh, Gábor (19 November 2007). The Derveni Papyrus: Cosmology, Theology and Interpretation. Cambridge University Press. ISBN 978-0-521-04739-5.
- Betegh, Gábor (24 April 2014). "Pythagoreans, Orphism and Greek Religion". In Huffman, Carl A. (ed.). A History of Pythagoreanism. Cambridge University Press. pp. 149–66. ISBN 978-1-139-91598-4.
- Guthrie, William Keith Chambers (1935). Orpheus and Greek Religion: A Study of the Orphic Movement. Methuen & Company, Limited.
- Guthrie, William Keith Chambers (1955). The Greeks and Their Gods. by W.K.C. Guthrie. Beacon Press.
- Kirk, G. S.; Raven, J. E.; Schofield, M. (29 December 1983). The Presocratic Philosophers: A Critical History with a Selection of Texts. Cambridge University Press. ISBN 978-0-521-27455-5.
- Meisner, Dwayne A. (2018). Orphic Tradition and the Birth of the Gods. Oxford University Press. ISBN 978-0-19-066352-0.
- Sider, David; Obbink, Dirk (30 October 2013). Doctrine and Doxography. Walter de Gruyter. ISBN 978-3-11-033137-0.
- Richardson, N. J. (1985). "The Orphic Poems". The Classical Review. 35 (1): 87–90. doi:10.1017/S0009840X00107474. JSTOR 3063696. S2CID 162276006.
- Parker, Robert (1995). "Early Orphism". In Powell, Anton (ed.). The Greek World. Psychology Press. pp. 483–510. ISBN 978-0-415-06031-8.
- West, Martin Litchfield (1983). The Orphic Poems. Clarendon Press. ISBN 978-0-19-814854-8.
