= Theristai =

Lost satyr play by Euripides

- Original language: Ancient Greek
- Written by: Euripides
- Chorus: Satyrs
- Genre: Satyr play

Premiere
- Date: 431 BC
- Place: Athens

Theristai (Ancient Greek: Θερισταί, also known as Reapers or Harvesters), is a lost satyr play by Attic playwright Euripides. It was initially performed at the Dionysia in Athens in 431 BCE along with the tragedies Medea, Philoctetes and Dictys. The tetralogy finished in 3rd place, behind tetralogies by Euphorion (Aeschylus' son), who won 1st prize, and Sophocles.

The play was recorded as having been lost as early as 200 BCE by Aristophanes of Byzantium in his hypothesis for Medea. No fragments have been assigned to Theristai. It has been suggested that this play may be an alternate title for Euripides' lost play Syleus, for which several fragments are extant.
