= Philoctetes (Euripides play) =

Lost tragedy by Euripides

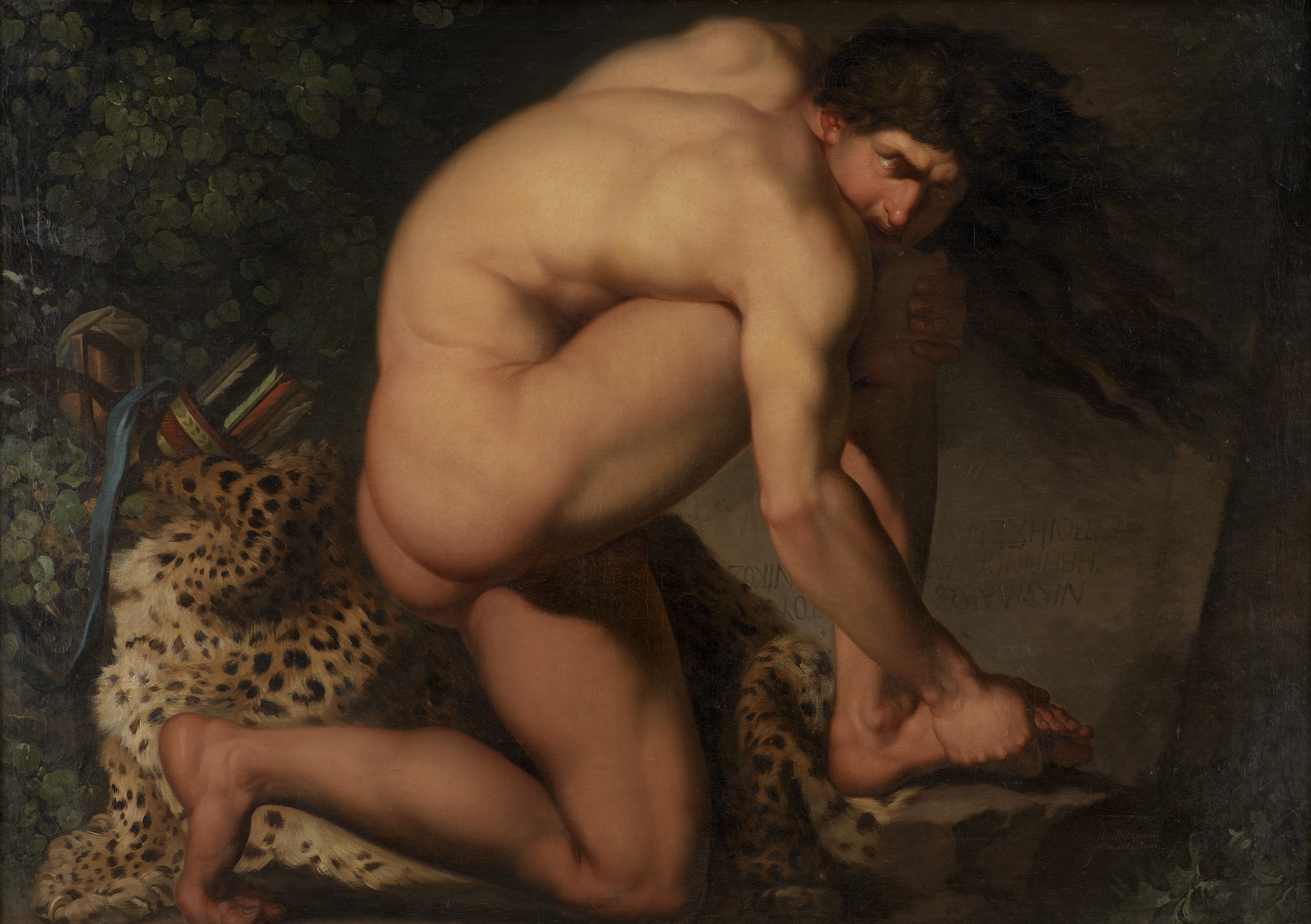
- The wounded Philoctetes
- Written by: Euripides
- Chorus: Men of Lemnos
- Characters: Philoctetes; Odysseus; Diomedes; Actor; Trojan ambassador Others?
- Original language: Ancient Greek
- Genre: Tragedy
- Setting: Lemnos

Premiere
- Date premiered: 431 BCE
- Place premiered: Athens

Philoctetes (Ancient Greek: Φιλοκτήτης) is a tragedy by the Athenian poet Euripides. It was probably first produced in 431 BCE at the Dionysia in a tetralogy that included the extant Medea and was awarded third prize. It is now lost except for a few fragments. Much of what we know of the plot is from the writings of Dio Chrysostom, who compared the Philoctetes plays of Aeschylus, Euripides and Sophocles and also paraphrased the beginning of Euripides' play.

== Fragments ==
Less than 20 fragments of Euripides' Philoctetes survive, amounting to about 40 lines. We do know the broad outline of the plot from a comparison by Dio Chrysostom of Euripides' Philoctetes with Aeschylus' Philoctetes (probably 470s BCE) and Sophocles' Philoctetes (409 BCE). In addition, portions of Dio's paraphrase of the early portion of the play are extant. The extant portions of Dio's paraphrase cover the bulk of fragments number 787 through 790. A fragment of a hypothesis of the play exists providing some background information.

== Plot ==
Philoctetes is mentioned briefly in Homer's Iliad and Odyssey, and his story was expanded on in Lesches' Little Iliad and Arctinus' Iliupersis. While in transit to fight the Trojan War, the Greeks had abandoned Philoctetes on the island of Lemnos on their way to Troy because they could not stand his screams of pain and the odor from his wound after he was bitten by a poisonous snake. However, ten years into the Trojan War they found out that Philoctetes and his bow and arrows were required to conquer Troy.

In the original versions of the story, Diomedes was sent to recover Philoctetes and bring him back to Troy. Aeschylus' play introduced the innovation that Odysseus, who was largely responsible for Philoctetes being marooned on Lemnos was sent to fetch him. Euripides (and Sophocles) retained this plot point in their versions of the story. However, Euripides pays homage to the original approach by including Diomedes as Odysseus' partner in convincing Philoctetes to return to the Greek cause.

The play begins with Odysseus arriving alone in front of Philoctetes' cave and discussing with himself why he has taken on yet one more dangerous task after all he has already risked for the Greek cause (fragment 789b). He claims it is because of man's ambition. He notes that the goddess Athena has told him that she will keep him safe by disguising him so that Philoctetes will not recognize him. (fragment 789b) He also notes that is mission is particularly urgent because an embassy of Trojans is planning to try and sway Philoctetes to support them.

Odysseus sees Philoctetes either leaving his cave or returning to it (fragment 789d). Odysseus is stunned by Philoctetes' shabby appearance (fragment 789d). Philoctetes' original Greek soldier outfit had worn out, and so he wears animal skins. Philoctetes does not recognize Odysseus, and Odysseus claims to be a soldier who has been betrayed by the Greek army (fragment 789d). Philoctetes offers Odysseus his hospitality but notes the poor conditions in which he lives (fragments 789d & 790). Although most scholars reconstructing the plot consider this dialogue an extension of the prologue, there may have been some intervening activity.

A man from Lemnos named Actor, who had previously befriended Philoctetes arrives and possibly warns Philoctetes that an embassy from Troy is coming. Actor's arrival may have followed an apology by the chorus of men from Lemnos for not having visited Philoctetes earlier (fragment 780c).

Following the arrival of Actor, we have less support from Dio, and so any plot reconstruction is more speculative. Certainly, there was a scene between Philoctetes and a representative from Troy, which is one of Euripides great innovations to the plot in his play. Wecklein and Webster have suggested that the Trojan representative may have been Paris. After Philoctetes' initial refusal to support the Trojans, the disguised Odysseus may have interceded with political and patriotic support for Philoctetes' position. Fragment 796, in which Odysseus states that it is shameful to keep silent while letting barbarians speak, probably relates to this scene, and fragment 795 probably does as well. This introduces a patriotism theme, since Odysseus is pretending he has been rejected by the Greek army, but nonetheless considers it necessary to oppose the Trojan embassy. After the Trojans left, Odysseus may have expressed mixed emotions - satisfaction that the threat of Philoctetes supporting the Trojans has been eliminated, but anxiety that Philoctetes' stubbornness in dealing with the Trojans would also make his mission difficult.

Although Dio tells us that Diomedes was a character in the play, he does not tell us Diomedes' role. Collard, following Wecklein, suggests that Diomedes entrance may have been shortly after the Trojans left as part of a pre-arranged plan with Odysseus to trick Philoctetes into giving up the bow. Diomedes may have entered, been recognized by Philoctetes, causing Philoctetes' wound to act up. This would have given Odysseus and Diomedes the opportunity to steal the bow, at which point Odysseus may have removed his disguise for additional dramatic effect. In any case, we know from Dio that Philoctetes eventually agreed to join the Greeks at Troy as a result of "forcible persuasion." Hence, there may have been additional pressure put on Philoctetes after the bow was stolen in order to get him to agree to go to Troy. However, we do not know how Philoctetes was persuaded to join the Greek cause, or whether—similar to Sophocles' treatment— a deus ex machina was involved, although most reconstructors do not believe a deus ex machina would have been necessary.

== Chorus ==
The chorus of the play is made up of men of Lemnos. Euripides has his chorus apologize for failing to visit Philoctetes in the ten years since he arrived, which Dio considered less straightforward that Aeschylus' approach to the chorus, which simply arrived without having visited but without apologizing.

== Reception ==
Philoctetes was first performed at the City Dionysia in 431 BCE, in a tetralogy that also included the extant tragedy Medea, the lost tragedy Dictys and the lost satyr play Theristai. The tetralogy won third prize, finishing behind tetralogies by Euphorion (Aeschylus' son), who won first prize, and by Sophocles, who won second prize.

Aristophanes parodied Philoctetes' beggarly appearance in Euripides play in his comedy The Acharnians.

Dio praised Euripides' Philoctetes for its subtlety and rhetoric, and for the chorus' advice to be virtuous. Dio criticized Euripides' handling of the chorus relative to Aeschylus' approach, feeling that by having the chorus apologize for not visiting earlier he draws attention to the improbability that the chorus would not have done so.
