= Agias =

8th-century BC Greek poet

Agias or Hagias (Greek: Ἀγίας) of Troezen (fl. 740 BC) was an ancient Greek poet celebrated in antiquity as the author of Nostoi (Νόστοι), an epic poem in five books on the history of the return of the Achaean heroes from Troy, which began with the cause of the misfortunes which befell the Achaeans on their way home and after their arrival, that is, with the outrage committed upon Cassandra and the Palladium; and the whole poem filled up the space which was left between the work of the poet Arctinus and the Odyssey.

The ancients themselves appear to have been uncertain about the author of this poem, for they refer to it simply by the name of Nostoi, and when they mention the author, they only call him "the writer of the Nostoi" (ὁ τοὺς Νόστους γράψας). Hence some writers attributed the Nostoi to Homer, while others call its author a Colophonian. Similar poems, and with the same title, were written by other poets also, such as Eumelus of Corinth, Anticleides of Athens, Cleidemus, and Lysimachus of Alexandria. Where the Nostoi is mentioned without a name, it was generally understood to have been the work of this Agias.

His name was formerly written Augias through a mistake of the first editor of the Excerpta of Proclus. This misreading was corrected by Friedrich Thiersch, from the Codex Monacensis, which in one passage has "Agias", and in another "Hagias". The name itself does not occur in early Greek writers, unless it be supposed that the "Egias" or "Hegias" (Ἡγίας) in Clement of Alexandria and Pausanias, are only different forms of the same name.
