= The Man in the Maze (novel) =

1969 novel by Robert Silverberg

- Cover of first edition (hardcover)
- Author: Robert Silverberg
- Language: English
- Genre: Science fiction
- Publisher: Sidgwick & Jackson
- Publication date: 1969
- Publication place: United States
- Media type: Print (hardback & paperback)
- Pages: 192

The Man in the Maze is a science fiction novel by American writer Robert Silverberg, originally serialized in the magazine Worlds of If in April and May 1968, and published in bookstores the following year. It tells the tale of a man rendered incapable of interacting normally with other human beings by his uncontrollable psychic abilities. The novel is inspired by Sophocles' play Philoctetes, with the roles of Odysseus, Neoptolemus and Philoctetes played by Boardman, Rawlins, and Muller, respectively.

The novel deals with themes of isolation and social alienation, using psychic powers as an allegory for human interaction. In 1968, the United States adopted the Architectural Barriers Act, which mandated that public buildings be accessible to people with disabilities. In the same year, Silverberg published The Man in the Maze, in serial form, with it being novelized in 1969.

In a typical literary reversal of the New Wave, in the story, a disabled man uses an alien labyrinthine city to reject abled society. Silverberg reframed the ancient notions of disability discussed in Philoctetes in order to highlight contemporary debates of disability and project them into a utopian future that had apparently eliminated the notion. In doing so Silverberg stressed how "process, ability and disability come to construct and problematize both individual and collective human identity for the past, present, and future".^{:143}

Silverberg employed similar techniques in Dying Inside.

== Plot summary ==
The action takes place in the future. The main character is Richard Muller, a retired diplomat, who finds himself forced to hide from the human race on the uninhabited planet of Lemnos. He lives there in the center of an ancient city-maze, built by a vanished race. The outer zones of the maze are filled with lethal traps to discourage entrance into the central zone.

In his earlier life he had honestly served humanity, traveled to hundreds of worlds, endured hardship and danger. The career diplomat Charles Boardman invited him to make contact with the inhabitants of the planet Beta Hydri IV—the only intelligent alien race thus far discovered in the galaxy. When Muller returned after spending five months on Hydra without seeming to establish any meaningful communication with the natives at all, he discovered that other human beings could not bear to be close to him as he emanated an intolerable mental repulsion field. His own inner emotions were so fully exposed to anyone near him that they were intolerably painful. Earth science could not understand or trace the origin of these emanations from Muller's brain and he went into voluntary exile.

After nine years, however, Boardman invades his self-imposed isolation. The lethal snares of the maze are penetrated, firstly with robot drones and later with human volunteers, many of whom perish. Ned Rawlins, son of a now-dead friend of Muller's, establishes contact with him and, under the instruction of Boardman, promises him a cure as a means of luring him out of the maze. Muller agrees to go, but Rawlins' conscience compels him to tell Muller the whole truth as far as he knows it: that only Muller has the ability to make contact with aliens from another galaxy who are on their way to extinguishing human civilization.

Already six human worlds have been overrun, the people turned into zombie slaves. The aliens do not seem to realize that the humans are rational beings. The aliens are huge in physical size, communicate with each other telepathically, are physically very limited but are able to enslave the inhabitants of entire planets. Only one person—Muller, who can radiate telepathically—might be able to communicate with them; yet his experiences have made him potentially furiously hostile to any further contact with aliens, indeed with the human race itself.

After a dramatic meeting with Boardman, Muller agrees to meet the aliens. He flies to the edge of the galaxy, is taken inside an alien ship, and there seems to have his whole psyche read by the aliens. When he returns, Muller meets Rawlins and discovers that his repulsion field has now vanished. To Rawlins' disappointment, however, instead of returning to Earth and its comforts and pleasures, Muller decides to return to the maze. The worldly-wise Boardman is sure he will come back out in a few years, but Rawlins does not think so. At the end of the story we are left without knowing what resulted from this contact with the alien civilization, or what ultimately happened to Muller. Rawlins is meanwhile following in Muller's footsteps, and those of the innumerable reckless adventurers before him, from the seamen of old to the space-farers of the remote future century of the novel. The last sentences read: "He held the girl tightly. But he left before dawn".
