= Petelia Gold Tablet =

Inscribed gold religious tablet

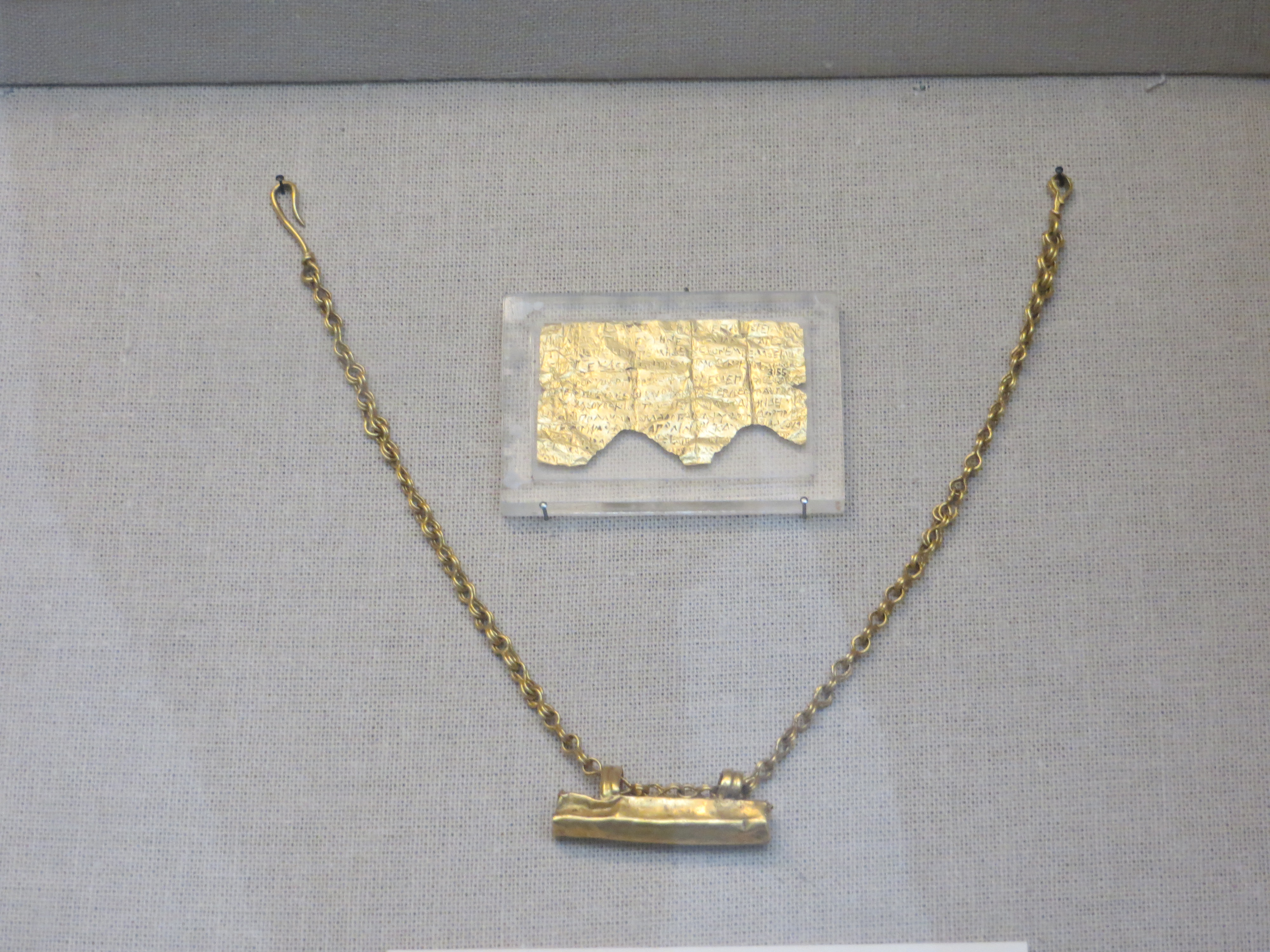
- The Petelia Gold Tablet (with case and chain) in the British Museum
- Material: Gold
- Size: 4.5cm long (tablet)
- Created: 3rd-2nd Centuries BC (tablet)
- Present location: British Museum, London
- Registration: 1843,0724.3

The Petelia Gold Tablet or Petelia Tablet is an Orphic inscription or Totenpass that was found near the ancient city of Petelia, southern Italy in the early nineteenth century. Since 1843, the original has been kept in the British Museum.

== Discovery ==
In the 1830s, an inscribed gold tablet was unearthed at the ancient Greek site of Petelia near Strongoli in Calabria. Little is known of the circumstances of the find nor of its provenance subsequent to the find, before it was acquired by the British Museum from the archaeologist and collector James Millingen in 1843.

== Description ==
The small gold tablet is inscribed in ancient Greek with an Orphic saying and dates from between 300 and 200 BC. The gold case and chain designed to hold it is much later in manufacture, having been made over 400 years later during Roman times. The ancient Thracian prophet Orpheus, who was often represented as a musician or poet, founded a cult that promised a happy afterlife to the initiated. Many of his temples or shrines were considered oracles by his devotees. The Petelia Gold Tablet probably came from one of his shrines in southern Italy and demonstrates the widespread distribution of Οrphism in antiquity.

== Translation of the inscription ==
1. ΕΥΡΗΣΣΕΙΣΔΑΙΔΑΟΔΟΜΩΝΕΠΑΡΙΣΤΕΡΑΚΡΗΝ
2. ΗΝΠΑΡΔΑΥΤΗΙΛΕΥΚΗΝΕΣΤΗΚΥΙΑΝΚΥΠΑΡΙΣΣΟΝ
3. ΤΑΥΤΗΣΤΗΣΚΡΗΝΗΣΜΗΔΕΣΧΕΔΟΝΕΜΠΕΛΑΣΕΙΑΣ
4. ΕΥΡΕΗΣΕΙΣΔΕΤΕΡΑΝΤΗΣΜΝΗΜΟΣΥΝΗΣΑΠΟΛΙΜΝΗΣ
5. ΨΥΧΡΟΝΥΔΩΡΠΡΟΡΕΟΝΦΥΛΑΚΕΣΔΕΠΙΠΡΟΣΘΕΝΕΑΣΙΝ
6. ΕΙΠΕΙΝΓΗΣΠΑΙΣΕΙΜΙΚΑΙΟΥΡΑΝΟΥΑΣΤΕΡΟΕΝΤΟΣΑΥΤΑΡΕΜ
7. ΟΙΓΕΝΟΣΟΥΡΑΝΙΟΝΤΟΔΕΔΙΣΤΕΚΑΙΑΥΤΟΙΔΙΨΗΙΔΕΙΜΙΑΥ
8. ΗΚΑΙΑΠΟΛΛΥΜΑΙΑΛΛΑΔΟΤΑΙΨΑΨΥΧΡΟΝΥΔΩΡΠΡΟΡΕ
9. ΟΝΤΗΣΜΝΗΜΟΣΥΝΗΣΑΠΟΛΙΜΝΗΣΚΑΥΤ[..]Σ[.]ΙΔΩΣΟΥΣΙ
10. ΠΙΕΙΝΘΕΙΗΣΑΠ[....]ΝΗΣΚΑΙΤΟΤΕΠΕΙΤΑ[.........]ΗΡΩΕ
11. ΣΣΙΝΑΝΑΞΕΙ[....... .]ΝΗΣΤΟΔΕΙ̣[
12. ΘΑΝΕΙΣΘ[................]ΟΔΕΓΡΑ[
  - in right margin: Τ̣Ο̣Γ̣Λ̣Ω̣Σ̣Ε̣Ι̣Π̣Α̣ΣΚΟΤΟΣΑΜΦΙΚΑΛΥΨΑΣ

Transcription into Ancient Greek:

1. Εὑρήσ{σ}ειϛ <δ’> Ἀίδαο δόμων ἐπ ̓ ἀριστερὰ κρήνην,
2. πὰρ δ’ αὐτῆι λευκὴν ἑστηκυῖαν κυπάρισσον·
3. ταύτηϛ τῆϛ κρήνηϛ μηδὲ σχεδὸν ἐμπελάσειαϛ.
4. εὑρήσειϛ δ’ ἑτέραν, τῆϛ Μνημοσύνηϛ ἀπὸ λίμνηϛ
5. ψυχρὸν ὕδωρ προρέον· φύλακεϛ δ’ ἐπίπροσθεν ἔασιν.
6. εἰπεῖν· ̔Γῆϛ παῖϛ εἰμι καὶ Οὐρανοῦ ἀστερόεντοϛ,
7. αὐτὰρ ἐμοὶ γένοϛ οὐράνιον· τόδε δ’ ἴστε καὶ αὐτοί.
8. δίψηι δ’ εἰμὶ αὔη καὶ ἀπόλλυμαι. ἀλλὰ δότ’ αἶψα
9. ψυχρὸν ὕδωρ προρέον τῆϛ Μνημοσύνηϛ ἀπὸ λίμνηϛ.’
10. καὐτ[οί] σ[ο]ι δώσουσι πιεῖν θείηϛ ἀπ[ὸ κρή]νηϛ,
11. καὶ τότ ἔπειτα [τέλη σὺ μεθ’] ἡρώεσσιν ἀνάξει[ϛ].
12. [Μνημοσύ]νης τόδε [†εριον†·ἐπεὶ ἂν μέλληισι] θανεῖσθ[αι
13. ....] τόδε γραψ[
14. (in right margin) ...... τογλωσειπα σκότοϛ ἀμφικαλύψαϛ.

Translation (2016):

1. You will find a spring on your left in Hades’ halls
2. and by it the cypress with its luminous sheen.
3. Do not go near this spring or drink its water.
4. You will find another, cold water flowing from Memory's lake;
5. its guardians stand before it.
6. Say: ‘I am a child of Earth and starry Heaven,
7. but descended from Heaven; you yourselves know this.
8. I am parched with thirst and dying: quickly, give me
9. the cool water flowing from Memory’s lake.’
10. And they will give you water from the sacred spring
11. and then you will join the heroes at their rites.
12. This [is the .... of Memo]ry: [on the point of] death
  ] write this [
  ] the darkness folding [you] within it.

== Bibliography ==
- R.G. Edmonds III (ed.), The ‘Orphic’ Gold Tablets and Greek Religion: Further along the Path, Cambridge University Press, New York, 2011
- Edmonds III, R.G. Myths of the Underworld Journey: Plato, Aristophanes, and the ‘Orphic’ Gold Tablets. Cambridge University Press, 2004
- Graf, Fritz & Johnston, Sarah Iles. Ritual Texts for the Afterlife: Orpheus and the Bacchic Gold Tablets. London & New York: Routledge, 2007
- Jenner T, Ritual Performance and the Gold Leaves in Percutio 3, 2009.
- Jenner T, The Gold Leaf from Petelia, ka mate ka ora: a New Zealand journal of poetry and poetics, 2012
- Smith C, "The Petelia Gold Tablet." The Journal of Hellenic Studies 3 (1882): 111–18.
- Percutio 2016, Nr. 10, ISSN 1953-1427.
