= Nostoi =

Lost Ancient Greek epic

The Nostoi (Greek: Νόστοι Nóstoi, sing. nostos lit. 'return home'), also known as Returns or Returns of the Greeks, is a lost epic poem of ancient Greek literature. A part of the Epic Cycle, also known as the Trojan cycle, it narrated the stories of the Achaean heroes returning to Greece after the end of the Trojan War. The story of the Nostoi comes chronologically after that of the Iliupersis (Sack of Ilium), and is followed by that of the Odyssey. The author of the Nostoi is uncertain; ancient writers attributed the poem variously to Agias (8th century BC), Homer (8th century BC), and Eumelos of Corinth (8th century BC) (see Cyclic Poets). The poem comprised five books of verse in dactylic hexameter.

== Date ==
Both the date of composition of the Nostoi and the date that it was set into writing are very uncertain. The text is most likely to have been finalized in the 7th or the 6th century BC.

== Contents ==
The Nostoi relates the return home of the Greek heroes after the end of the Trojan War. In current critical editions only five and a half lines of the poem's original text survive. Current understandings on its storyline are almost entirely confined to a summary of the Cyclic epics contained in the chrestomathy attributed to an unknown Proklos (possibly to be identified with the 2nd-century AD grammarian Eutychius Proclus). A few other references also give indications of the poem's storyline.

The poem opens as the Greeks are getting ready to set sail back to Greece. The goddess Athena is wrathful because of the Greeks' impious behaviour in the sack of Troy (see Iliupersis). Agamemnon waits behind, to appease her; Diomedes and Nestor set sail straightaway, and reach home safely; Menelaus sets sail, but encounters a storm, loses most of his ships, lands in Egypt and is delayed there for several years. Other Greeks, including the prophet Calchas, go by land to Colophon, where Calchas dies and is buried.

As Agamemnon is getting ready to sail, Achilles's ghost appears to him and foretells his fate. Agamemnon makes a sacrifice and sets sail anyway; Neoptolemus, however, is visited by his grandmother, the sea nymph Thetis, who tells him to wait and make further sacrifices to the gods. Zeus sends a storm against Agamemnon and those accompanying him at Athena's request, thus Ajax the Lesser dies on the Kapherian rocks on the southern end of Euboea. Neoptolemus follows Thetis's advice and goes home by land; in Thrace he meets Odysseus at Maroneia, who has traveled there by sea. Neoptolemus arrives home, though Phoenix dies en route, and there he is recognised by his grandfather Peleus.

Agamemnon arrives home and is thereby murdered by his wife Clytemnestra and her lover, Agamemnon's cousin Aegisthus. Later Agamemnon's and Clytemnestra's son Orestes avenges the murder by killing both of them. Finally Menelaus arrives home from Egypt. (This last section, known as the Oresteia, is narrated in Odyssey books 3 and 4 by Nestor and Menelaos; and it was later also the basis for Aeschylus' trilogy of tragic plays, the Oresteia.)

At the end of the Nostoi the only living Greek hero who still has not returned home is Odysseus. His return is narrated in the Odyssey.

== Editions ==
- Online editions (English translation):
  - Fragments of the Nostoi translated by H.G. Evelyn-White, 1914 (public domain)
  - Fragments of complete Epic Cycle translated by H.G. Evelyn-White, 1914; Project Gutenberg edition
  - Proklos' summary of the Epic Cycle translated by Gregory Nagy
- Print editions (Greek):
  - A. Bernabé 1987, Poetarum epicorum Graecorum testimonia et fragmenta pt. 1 (Leipzig: Teubner)
  - M. Davies 1988, Epicorum Graecorum fragmenta (Göttingen: Vandenhoek & Ruprecht)
- Print editions (Greek with English translation):
  - M.L. West 2003, Greek Epic Fragments (Cambridge, Massachusetts: Harvard University Press)

== Sources ==
- Burgess, Jonathan S., The Tradition of the Trojan War in Homer and the Epic Cycle, The Johns Hopkins University Press, (2004). ISBN 0-8018-6652-9. (p. 180).
- Davies, Malcolm; Greek Epic Cycle, Duckworth Publishers; 2 edition (May 2, 2001). ISBN 1-85399-039-6.
- Endsjø, Dag (2009). Greek Resurrection Beliefs and the Success of Christianity. Palgrave Macmillan.
- Evelyn-White, Hugh G., Hesiod the Homeric Hymns and Homerica, BiblioBazaar (March 13, 2007). ISBN 1-4264-7293-5.
- Malkin, Irad (1998). The Returns of Odysseus; Colonization and Ethnicity. University of California Press.
- Mayor, Adrienne (2016). The Amazons; Lives and Legends of Warrior Women Across the Ancient World. Princeton University Press.
- Ogden, Daniel (2004). Greek and Roman Necromancy. Princeton University Press.
