= Macalla (ancient city) =

Macalla or Makalla (Ancient Greek: Μάκαλλα) was an ancient city of Bruttium.

The author of the Aristotelian Corpus writes that Philoctetes lived there after he returned from Troy, and adds that the hero had deposited there in the temple of Apollo Halius the bow and arrows of Hercules, which had, however, been removed by the Crotoniats to the temple of Apollo in their own city. We learn from this author that Macalla was in the territory of Crotone, Magna Graecia, about 120 stadia from that city; but its position cannot be determined. The author also add that the Philoctetes is honoured among the Sybarites. According to Lycophron, at Macalla was the sepulchre of Philoctetes, to whom the inhabitants paid divine honours.

It was doubtless an Oenotrian town: at a later period all trace of it disappears.
