= The Man in the Maze (film) =

The Man in the Maze (Movie)
- Theatrical release poster
- Directed by: Mitesh Kumar Patel
- Written by: Mitesh Kumar Patel
- Produced by: Mitesh Kumar Patel and
- Starring: Andrew Roth (actor); Liana Werner-Gray; Erik A. Williams; Stephanie Long Lomenick
- Cinematography: Josh Hodgins
- Music by: Sidharth - Suhas
- Distributed by: R-Squared Films; Applied Art Productions
- Release dates: October 30, 2010 (Mississippi); September 2, 2011
- Running time: 90 minutes
- Country: United States
- Language: English

The Man in the Maze is a 2010 American horror film. The film was produced in the United States and premiered at the 2010 Mississippi International film Festival. was the presenter for the film.

== Plot ==
The movie follows four college students that venture out into the woods to do research and discover an Indian burial mound. They soon discover that the mound is cursed and that they are trapped in a maze, chased by an unknown and terrifying force.

== Cast ==
- Andrew Roth as Alex
- Liana Werner-Gray as Megan
- Erik A. Williams as P.T.
- Stephanie Long Lomenick as Christi
- Mitesh Kumar Patel as Dark Cloud
- Arth Patel as Running Deer
- J.C. Hester as Soaring Eagle
- Steve Hester as Billy Ray Weston

== Production ==
Filming for the movie began in early 2010, with much of the shooting taking place in and around Florence, Alabama. The film was screened at several film festivals beginning in 2010, with the film's official release taking place in India in late 2011. Director Mitesh Patel explained the reason behind the India premiere because he "believes that cinema lovers in this country generally watch horror movies from Hollywood with great curiosity and anticipation".

== Reception ==
=== Awards and recognition ===
- Silver Ace Award at Las Vegas Film Festival 2011
- Official selection, St. Louis International Film Festival 2011
- Winner, Honorable Mention Award - Los Angeles Reel Film Festival 2011
