= Philoctetes (Aeschylus play) =

Lost tragedy by Aeschylus

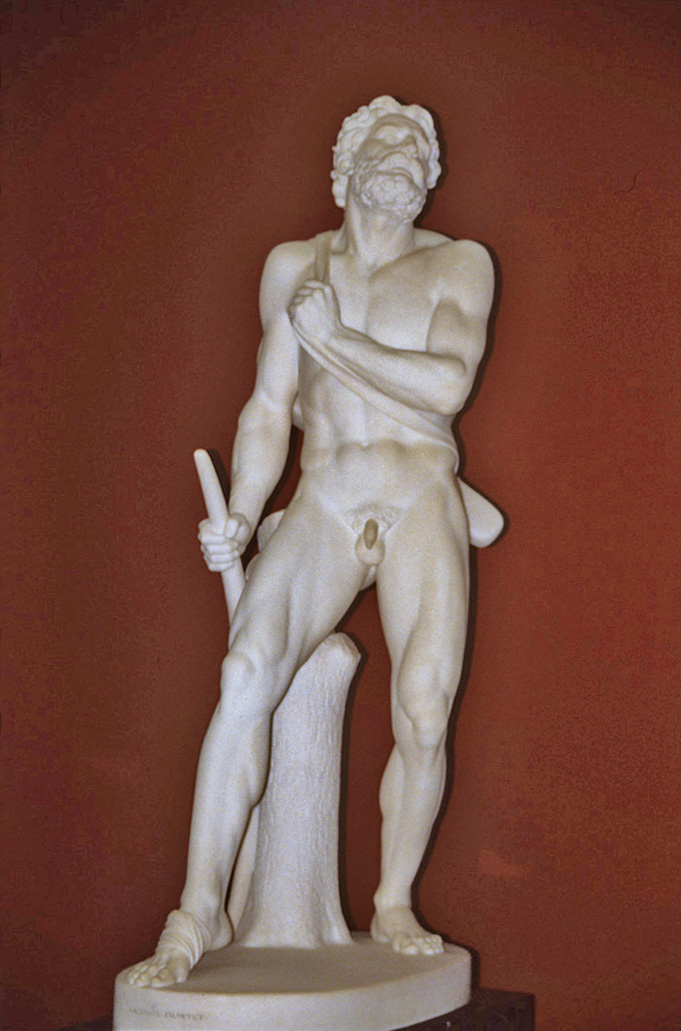
- Wounded Philoctetes
- Written by: Aeschylus
- Chorus: Men of Lemnos
- Characters: Philoctetes; Odysseus; Others?
- Original language: Ancient Greek
- Genre: Tragedy
- Setting: Lemnos

Premiere
- Date premiered: probably 470s BCE
- Place premiered: Athens

Philoctetes (Ancient Greek: Φιλοκτήτης) is a play by the Athenian poet Aeschylus. It was probably first produced during the 470s BCE. It is now lost except for a few fragments. Most of what we know of the plot is from the writings of 1st century orator Dio Chrysostom, who compared the Philoctetes plays of Aeschylus, Euripides and Sophocles.

== Fragments ==
The few extant fragments from the play are not much use in reconstructing Aeschylus' treatment. One fragment mentions that Philoctetes' bow has been hung on a pine tree. Several are of Philoctetes commenting on the pain in his foot, including one in which he longs for death. We do know the broad outline of the plot from a comparison by Dio Chrysostom of the Aeschylus' Philoctetes with Euripides' Philoctetes (431 BCE) and Sophocles' Philoctetes (409 BCE).

== Plot ==
Philoctetes is mentioned briefly in Homer's Iliad and Odyssey, and his story was expanded on in Lesches' Little Iliad and Arctinus' Iliupersis. The Greeks had abandoned Philoctetes on the island of Lemnos on their way to Troy because they could not stand his screams of pain and the odor from his wound after he was bitten by a poisonous snake. However, ten years into the Trojan War they found out that Philoctetes and his bow and arrows were required to conquer Troy.

In the original versions of the story, Diomedes was sent to recover Philoctetes and bring him back to Troy. However, in Aeschylus' play, Odysseus, who was largely responsible for Philoctetes being marooned on Lemnos was sent to fetch him. In addition to creating dramatic irony, the innovation of having Odysseus sent to fetch Philoctetes also has a benefit in that Odysseus is particularly known for his oratory skills, and oratory skills are particularly valuable in a Greek play. The plot point of having Odysseus being sent to recover Philoctetes after being responsible for his abandonment is a plot point that Euripides and Sophocles retained in their Philoctetes plays.

Philoctetes did not recognize Odysseus at first as a result of the suffering Philoctetes endured for the prior ten years alone. Odysseus gained Philoctetes' trust by falsely telling him that Agamemnon, who was also responsible for Philoctetes' abandonment, had died and that Odysseus had been executed for committing a shameful crime. It is not known exactly how Odysseus ultimately secured Philoctetes bow and cooperation, or whether he took them by force as he attempted to do in Euripides' and Sophocles' versions. Dio does tell us that Odysseus' pleas and lies were not inappropriate for someone of Odysseus' heroic stature.

According to Aspasius, Aeschylus' and Sophocles' Philoctetes attempted to hide his pain at first, but eventually the pain was too great and he was forced to scream.

== Chorus ==
The chorus in the play is made up of men of Lemnos. In Aeschylus' play, the men of Lemnos had not visited Philoctetes throughout his entire ten year time on the island. Philoctetes told the chorus his backstory of being abandoned by the Greeks. Dio considered Aeschylus' approach of having a chorus that had never visited Philoctetes but not apologizing for that more straightforward than Euripides' approach of an apologetic chorus. In Sophocles' Philoctetes, Lemnos is uninhabited, making the decision of the Greek commanders to maroon Philoctetes there even more heartless.

== Reception ==
Dio praised Aeschylus' version for its simplicity, dignity, grandeur and bold thought and language. Classics professor Norman Austin claims that Aeschylus' revisions to the original story actually make Aeschylus' story more Homeric.

== Date ==
The date of the original production of Philoctetes is unknown. However, it is generally believed that it was originally produced during the 470s BCE.
