= Philoctetes (Sophocles play) =

Ancient Greek tragedy by Sophocles

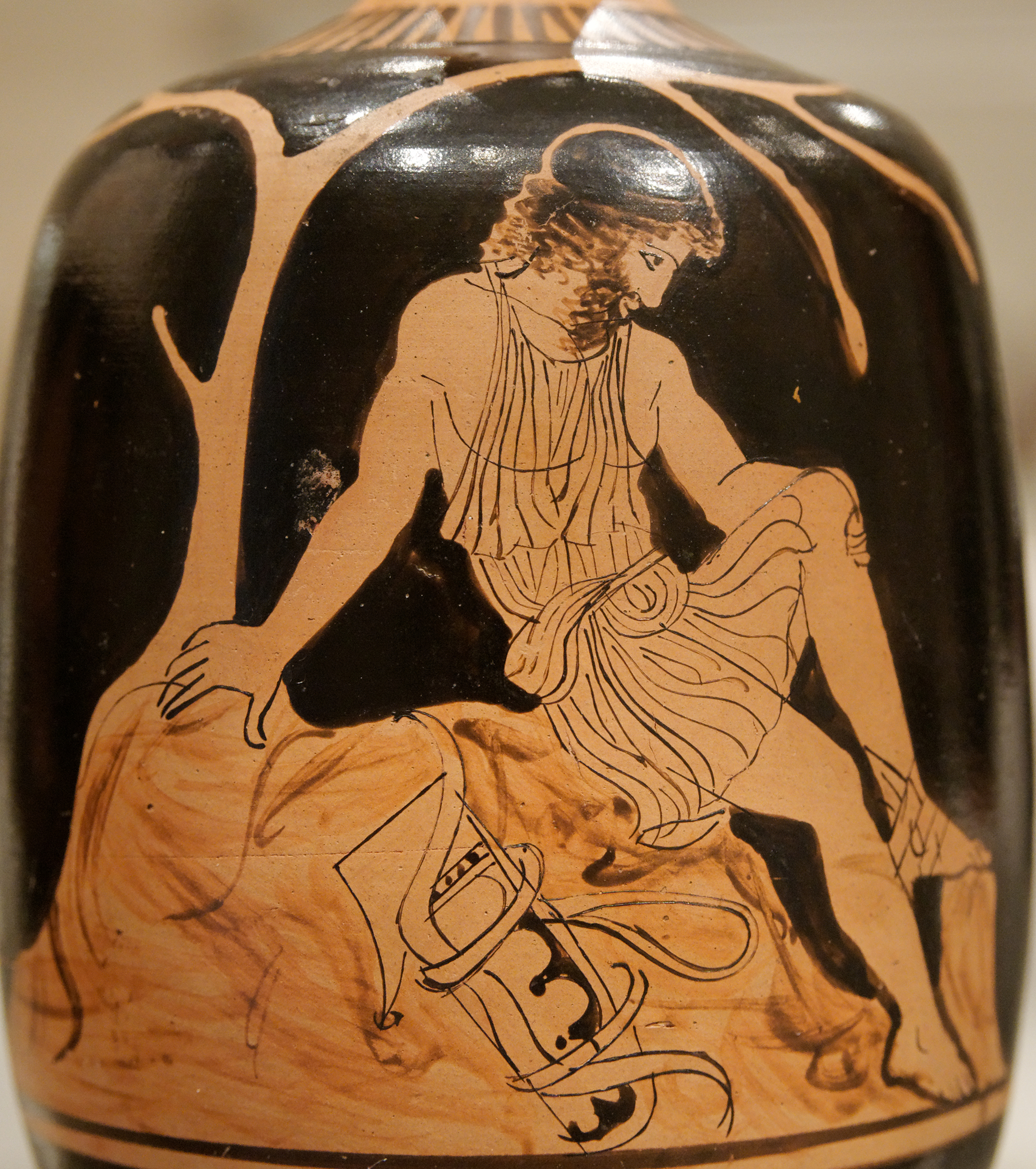
- Philoctetes on Lemnos (Attic red-figure squat lekythos, c. 420 BC
- Written by: Sophocles
- Chorus: Greek Sailors
- Characters: Odysseus; Neoptolemus; Philoctetes a trader Heracles
- Original language: Ancient Greek
- Genre: Tragedy
- Setting: Before a cave at Lemnos

Premiere
- Date premiered: 409 BC
- Place premiered: Athens

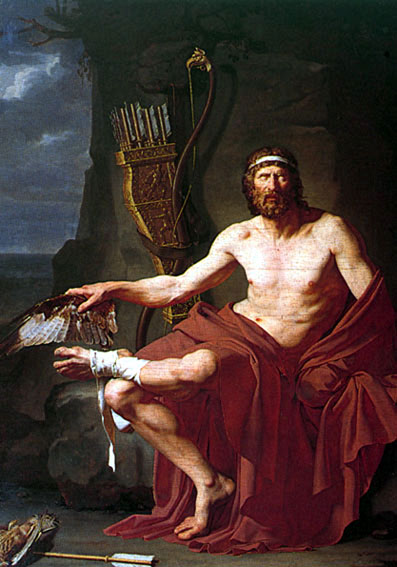
Philoctetes on Lemnos, by Jean-Germain Drouais

Philoctetes (Ancient Greek: Φιλοκτήτης, Philoktētēs; English pronunciation: /ˌfɪləkˈtiːtiːz/, stressed on the third syllable, -tet-) is a play by Sophocles (Aeschylus and Euripides also each wrote a Philoctetes but theirs have not survived). The play was written during the Peloponnesian War. It is one of the seven extant tragedies by Sophocles. It was first performed at the City Dionysia in 409 BC, where it won first prize. The story takes place during the last year of the Trojan War (after the majority of the events of the Iliad). It describes the attempt by Neoptolemus, son of Achilles, and Odysseus, king of Ithaca, to bring the disabled Philoctetes, the master archer, from the island of Lemnos to Troy in the hopes that he and his bow might help end the Trojan War.

== Background ==
When Heracles was near his death, he wished to be burned on a funeral pyre while still alive. In the play Philoctetes, Sophocles references the myth in which no one but Philoctetes would light Heracles' funeral pyre and, in return for this favor, Heracles gave Philoctetes his bow (seen in later texts, such as Ovid's Metamorphoses). Philoctetes left with the Greeks to participate in the Trojan War, but was bitten on the foot by a snake while walking on Chryse, a sacred ground. The bite caused him constant agony, and emitted a horrible smell. For this reason he was left by Odysseus and the Atreidai (sons of Atreus) on the desert island Lemnos as they were traveling from the Greek mainland to Troy.

Nine years pass, and the Greeks capture the Trojan seer Helenus, son of Priam. He foretells that they will need the master archer Philoctetes and the bow of Heracles to win the war. Odysseus sails back to Lemnos with Neoptolemus to get Philoctetes. The task is not easy, as Philoctetes bitterly hates Odysseus and the Greeks for leaving him there.

== Synopsis ==
Sophocles' Philoctetes begins with their arrival on the island of Lemnos. Odysseus explains to Neoptolemus that he must perform a shameful action in order to garner future glory—to trick Philoctetes into coming to Troy with a false story while Odysseus hides. Neoptolemus is portrayed as an honorable boy, taking some persuasion to get him to play this part. To gain Philoctetes' trust, Neoptolemus deceives Philoctetes into thinking he hates Odysseus as well. Neoptolemus does this by telling Philoctetes that Odysseus has his father's (Achilles) armor. He tells Philoctetes that this armor was his right by birth and that Odysseus would not give it up to him. After gaining Philoctetes' trust and offering him passage home, Neoptolemus is allowed to look at the bow of Heracles.

Neoptolemus holds the bow while Philoctetes is going into an unbearable fit of pain in his foot (due to the snake bite he bears on it). Feeling ashamed of having misled Philoctetes, Neoptolemus debates giving it back to him. Odysseus appears, and a series of arguments ensue. Eventually Neoptolemus' conscience gains the upper hand, and he returns the bow. After many threats made on both sides, Odysseus flees. Neoptolemus then tries to talk Philoctetes into coming to Troy by his own free will, but Philoctetes does not agree. In the end, Neoptolemus consents to take Philoctetes back to Greece, even though that will expose him to the anger of the army. This appears to be the conclusion of the play—however, as they are leaving, Heracles (now a deity) appears above them and tells Philoctetes that if he goes to Troy, he will be cured and the Greeks will win. Philoctetes willingly obeys him.

The play ends here. When Philoctetes later fights in Troy, his foot is healed, and he wins glory, killing many Trojans (including Paris).

== Themes and ideas ==
The concept of having a moral high ground is a key aspect in this play. The play makes the spectator question what morality means to each person. Furthermore, the play makes one question the struggle between what is right for the individual versus what is right for the group. It is possible that this struggle is irreconcilable. More specifically, one can see this struggle by looking at what has happened to Philoctetes versus what the Greeks need.

Another theme is that of trauma. Philoctetes suffers wounds that do not heal. Furthermore, Philoctetes' suffering is now what defines him, yet Neoptolemus pretends not to know Philoctetes at first. In other words, Philoctetes' suffering should at least make him known, but it is as if his story is dead.

== Adaptations ==
- Philoctetes also figures in Les Aventures de Télémaque (1699) by François Fénelon.
- The Cure at Troy by Seamus Heaney, based on Philoctetes, which was adapted for radio and broadcast on BBC Radio 3 in 1993.
- Neutral Ground by Tom Stoppard, loosely based on Philoctetes (as stated in the introduction to Stoppard's collected television plays).
- The Man in the Maze by Robert Silverberg, a retelling of the play in a science fictional idiom.
- An Arrow's Flight a novel by Mark Merlis
- Heracles' Bow (short story) by Madeline Miller
- Paradise by Kae Tempest, performed at the Royal National Theatre in London in 2021
- Philoctetes, Play of Aeschylus
- Philoctetes, Play of Euripides

=== The Theater of War Project ===
Since 2005, Bryan Doerries and Theater of War Productions have been producing readings of his adaptation of the play as the Theater of War Project, often paired with readings of Ajax, for both civilian and military audiences, paired with panel discussions afterwards, to address social and public health issues.

A 2007 recording of one of these readings, featuring Michael Stuhlbarg as Philoctetes, Jesse Eisenberg as Neoptolemus, and Adam Ludwig as Odysseus, is available on the Youtube platform.

== Translations ==
- Thomas Francklin, 1759 – verse: full text
- Richard C. Jebb, 1904 – prose: full text
- Francis Storr, 1912 – verse
- Kathleen Freeman, 1948 – verse OCLC 10111365
- E.F. Watling, 1953 - verse and prose
- David Grene, 1957 – verse
- Kenneth McLeish, 1979 – verse
- Gregory McNamee, 1986 – prose: full text
- Christopher Webber, 1989 – verse and prose
- Desmond Egan, 1991 poetic prose
- Seth L. Schein, 2003 – verse and prose
- Carl Phillips, 2003
- Ian C. Johnston, 2008 - verse: full text
- George Theodoridis, 2009 – prose: full text
- Bryan Doerries, 2014 – verse
