= Hypothesis (drama) =

P. Oxy. 3650, with hypotheses to Euripides' Alexandros (col. 1) and Andromache (col. 2)

In its ancient usage, a hypothesis is a summary of the plot of a classical drama. These hypotheses were often copied as a preface to the text of the surviving Athenian tragedies in Medieval manuscripts. They also indicated whether any other tragic poets had dramatised the story, gave its setting, identified the chorus and the character who delivered the prologue, and indicated the date of its first production and the titles of the poet's other plays performed that year, as well as the poet's rivals in the dramatic competition and the prize awarded.

== Gallery ==
C14 manuscript with the closing lines of The Suppliant Women and hypothesis to and opening lines of Cyclops

C15 manuscript of the same, with rubricated hypothesis headed ὑπόθεσιϲ κύκλωποϲ, "hypothesis to Cylops"

== Sources ==
- Easterling, P. E., ed. 1997. The Cambridge Companion to Greek Tragedy. Cambridge Companions to Literature ser. Cambridge: Cambridge UP. ISBN 0-521-42351-1.
- Gregory, Justina, ed. 2005. A Companion to Greek Tragedy. Blackwell Companions to the Ancient World ser. Malden, MA and Oxford: Blackwell. ISBN 1-4051-7549-4.
