= Petelia =

Petilia or Petelia (Ancient Greek: Πετηλία) was a city name found in some ancient works of classical antiquity. It's widely accepted that in antiquity there were two cities with this name, both located in Southern Italy. One of them, Petilia, was located in ancient Lucania (today's Basilicata and Campania), while the second one, Petelia, was located on the coast of Bruttium (today's Calabria).

== Petilia (Lucania) ==
Strabo states that Petilia had a prestigious status among Lucanians, even though the same author, in his work Geographica, often mistakes Petilia with Petelia. According to modern scholars, Petilia was probably the city whose remains are found on Monte Stella. This last discovery was made by historian Giuseppe Antonini (1683–1785), based on some inscriptions reportedly found on the same site. Monte Stella is now a military area and permissions for archaeological excavations are not granted easily.

== Petelia (Bruttium) ==
An ancient Greek city located on the eastern coast of Bruttium, traditionally said to have been founded by Philoctetes.

During the Second Punic War, Petelia remained a Roman ally, while all of the other Bruttian cities had gone over to Hannibal. After a long siege, it was taken by the Carthaginians, its people expelled and replaced by other Bruttians; but following the Roman victory its original population was restored. Petelia's remains might be located in today's Petilia Policastro or Strongoli. The Petelia Gold Tablet was discovered near Strongoli in the nineteenth century.

Some historians claim that Ancient Petelia already was a bishopric, established perhaps in 546 or then adopting the city's new medieval name Strongoli, but without solid evidence, and the see is never mentioned in the Byzantine imperial Notitia Episcopatuum of the Patriarchate of Constantinople, which most dioceses in Calabria belonged to in the 9th till 11th centuries, so the diocese's foundation may rather date from the Normans, probably late 12th century.
