= Philoctetes =

Greek mythological hero

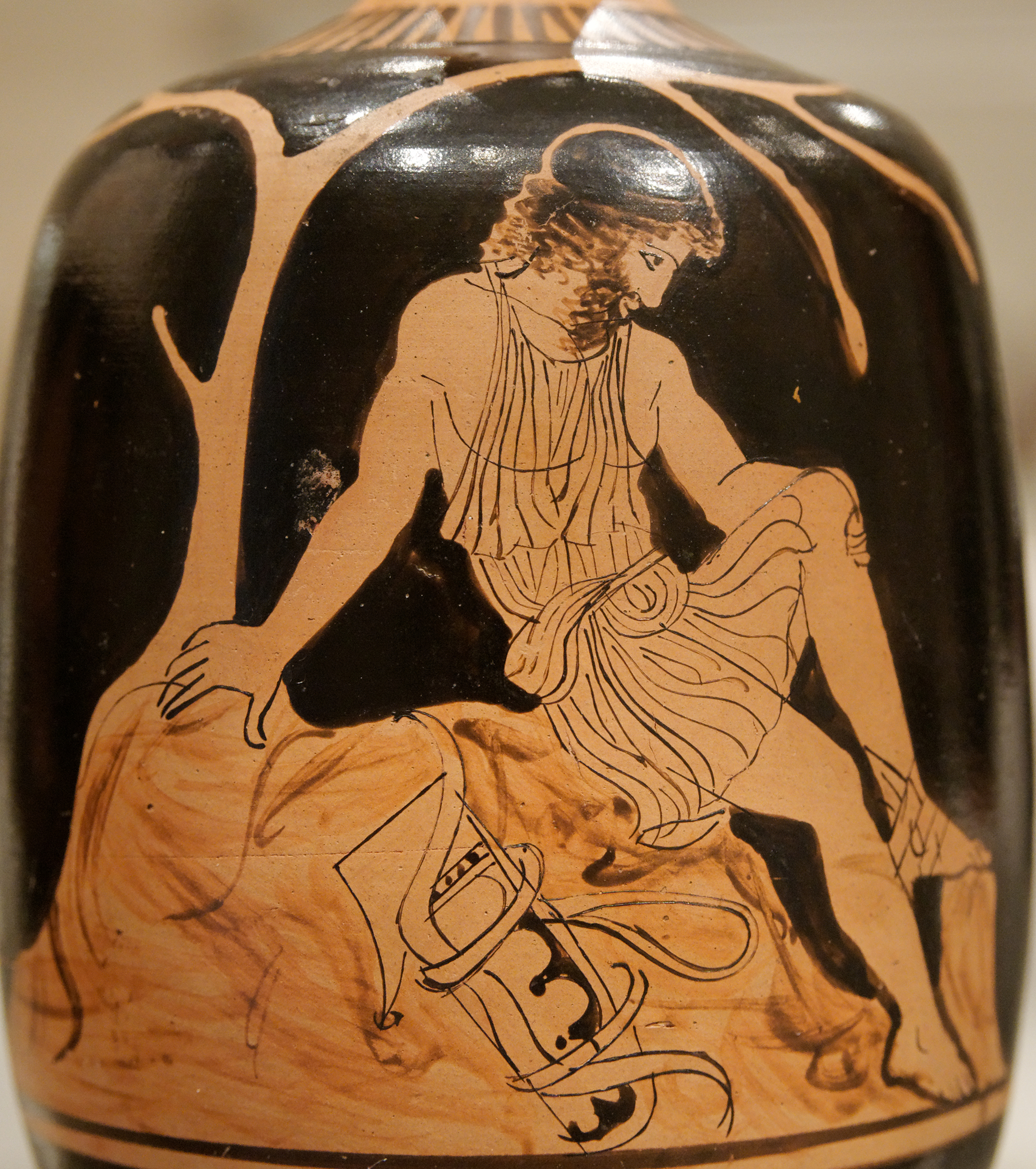
Philoctetes at Lemnos, on an Attic red-figure lekythos, ca. 420 BC (Metropolitan Museum of Art)

Philoctetes (Ancient Greek: Φιλοκτήτης Philoktētēs; English pronunciation: /ˌfɪləkˈtiːtiːz/, FILL-ək-TEE-teez) or Philocthetes, according to Greek mythology, was the son of Poeas, king of Meliboea in Thessaly, and Demonassa or Methone. He was a Greek hero, famed as an archer, and a participant in the Trojan War.

Philoctetes was the subject of four different plays of ancient Greece, each written by one of the three major Greek tragedians. Of the four plays, Sophocles' Philoctetes is the only one that has survived. Sophocles' Philoctetes at Troy, Aeschylus' Philoctetes and Euripides' Philoctetes have all been lost, with the exception of some fragments. Philoctetes is also mentioned in Homer's Iliad, Book 2, which describes his exile on the island of Lemnos, his being wounded by snake-bite, and his eventual recall by the Greeks. The recall of Philoctetes is told in the lost epic Little Iliad, where his retrieval was accomplished by Diomedes. Philoctetes killed three men at Troy.

== Description ==
Philoctetes was described by the chronicler Malalas in his account of the Chronography as "a good height, well set, dark skinned, eyebrows meeting, brave, good eyes, good nose, black hair, hairy, sensible, accurate archer, magnanimous".

== Stories ==
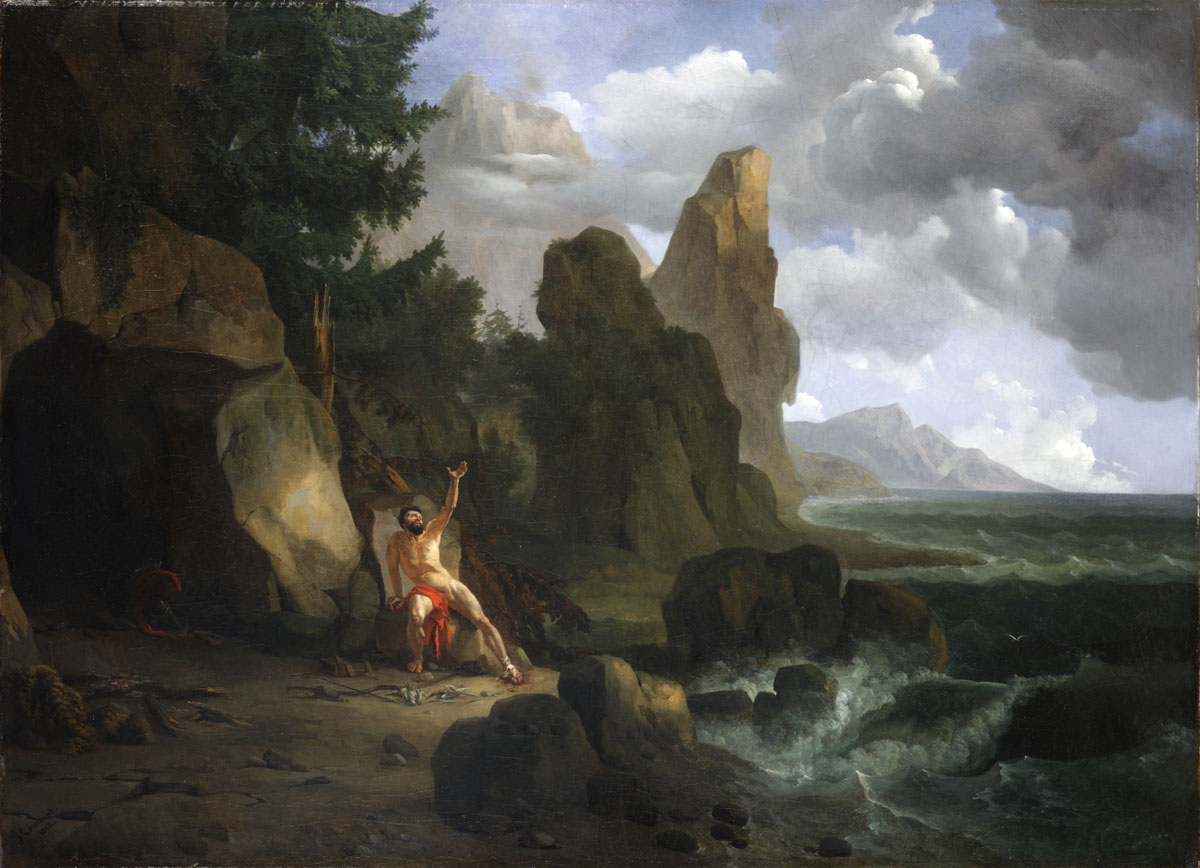
The isolation of Philoctetes on Lemnos, as painted by Jean-Charles-Joseph Rémond (1818)

Philoctetes was the son of Poeas, king of Meliboea in Thessaly. He came into possession of the bow and arrows of Heracles after assisting the hero in ending the agony of the shirt of Nessus—Philoctetes, or in some versions his father, lit the pyre on which Heracles immolated himself and became immortal. Philoctetes then received the favor of the newly deified Heracles.

Philoctetes had been one of the many eligible Greeks who competed for the hand of Helen, the Spartan princess; as such, he was required to participate in the expedition to reclaim her for Menelaus that became the Trojan War. However, on the way to Troy, Philoctetes was left behind and stranded on the island of Lemnos. There are at least four stories about what caused the Greeks to abandon Philoctetes, but in every version he received a wound on his foot that festered and had a terrible smell.

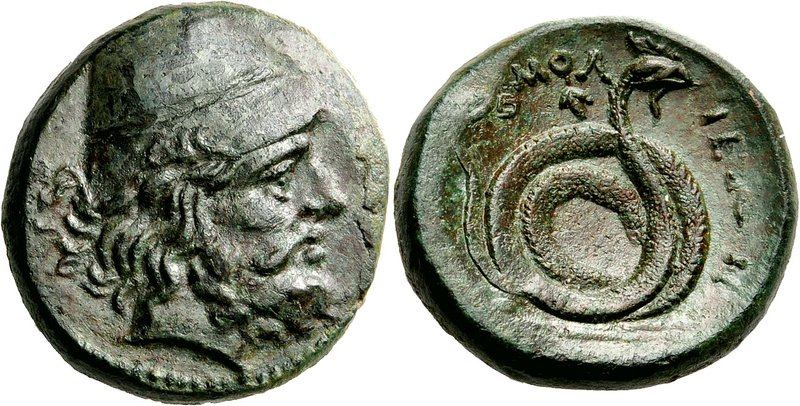
Philoctetes wearing a pilos cap on a bronze coin of Homolium, with a coiled serpent on the reverse (350 BC)

One version holds that Philoctetes was bitten by a snake that Hera sent to molest him as punishment for the service rendered to Heracles, since Hera was portrayed in one tradition as the adversary of Heracles. The snakebite recurs in a version that has the Achaeans, en route to Troy, coming to the island of Tenedos, where Achilles angered Apollo by killing King Tenes, allegedly the god's son. When the Achaeans were sacrificing to Apollo in expiation, a snake came out from the altar and bit Philoctetes.

Another tradition says that the Greeks forced Philoctetes to show them where Heracles's ashes were deposited. Philoctetes would not break his oath by speech, but he went to the spot and placed his foot upon the site. The foot that touched the soil over the ashes immediately suffered a wound.

In a fourth version, Philoctetes received his terrible wound on the island of Chryse when he unknowingly trespassed the shrine of the nymph after whom the island was named. (This is the version in the extant play by Sophocles.) A modern interpretation is that he was scratched by a poisoned arrow. Commonly tips of arrows were poisoned with a combination of fermented viper venom, blood or plasma, and feces. A person who survived would have a festering wound, though even a scratch could result in death, sometimes drawn out.

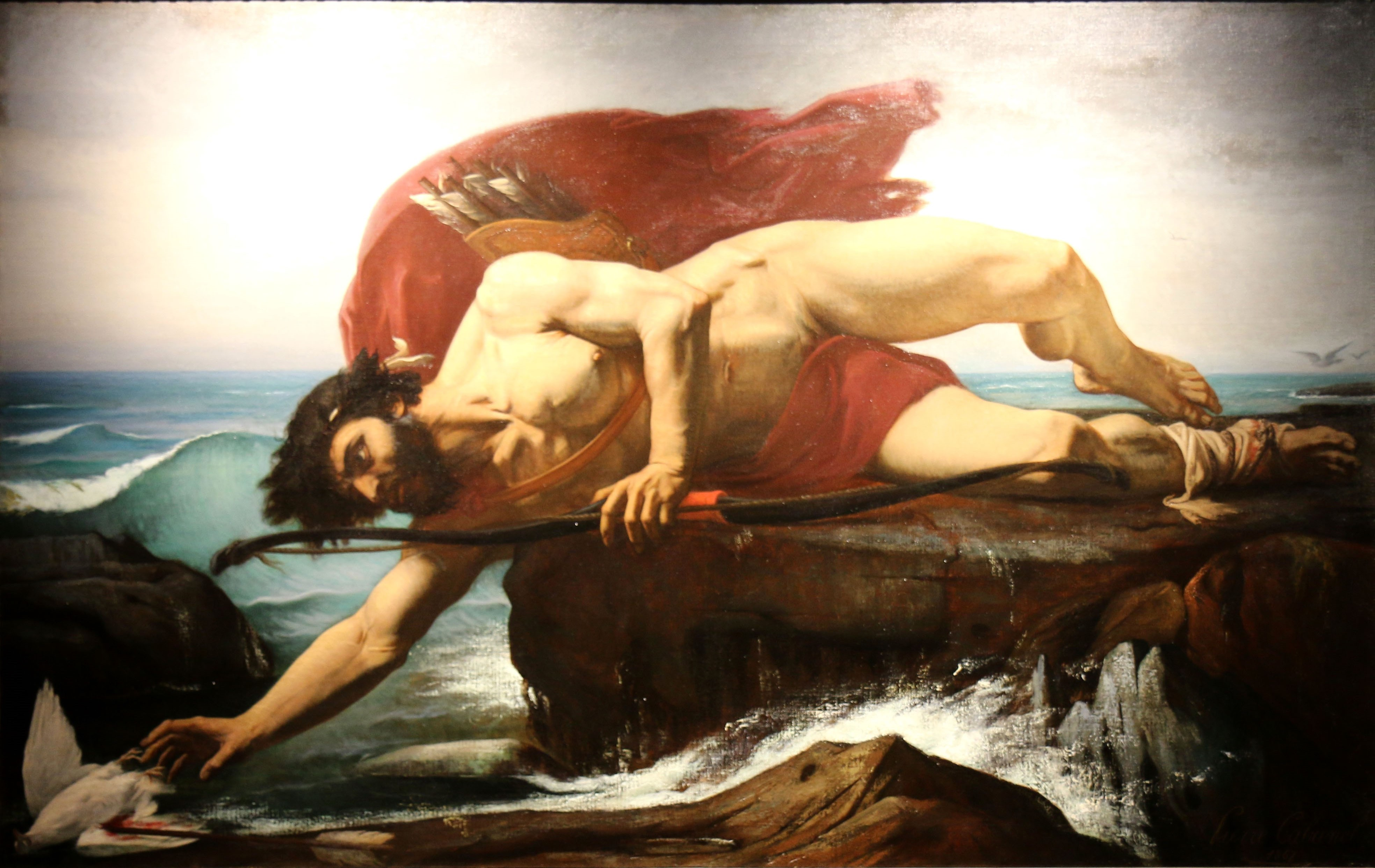
Philoctetes hunting for sustenance on Lemnos, oil painting by Pierre Cabanel (1838–1918)

Regardless of the cause of the wound, Philoctetes was marooned by the Greeks and harbored a grudge against Odysseus, who had advised the Atreidae to leave him. Medôn took control of Philoctetes' men, and Philoctetes himself remained on Lemnos, alone, for ten years, as the Trojan War dragged on.

Helenus, the prophetic son of King Priam of Troy, was forced under torture to reveal that one of the conditions for the Greeks to win the war was possession of the bow and arrows of Heracles. Upon hearing this, Odysseus and a group of men (usually including Diomedes) rushed back to Lemnos to recover Heracles' weapons. In the tragedy by Sophocles titled Philoctetes, Odysseus is accompanied by Neoptolemus, Achilles' son, also known as Pyrrhus. (Other versions of the myth don't include Neoptolemus.) Surprised to find the archer alive, the Greeks balked on what to do next. Odysseus tricked the weaponry away from Philoctetes, but Diomedes ( or Neoptolemus in Philoctetes, 1373ff.) refused to take the weapons without the man. The divine Heracles came down from Olympus and told Philoctetes to go and that he would be healed by the son of Asclepius and win great honor as a hero of the Achaean army.

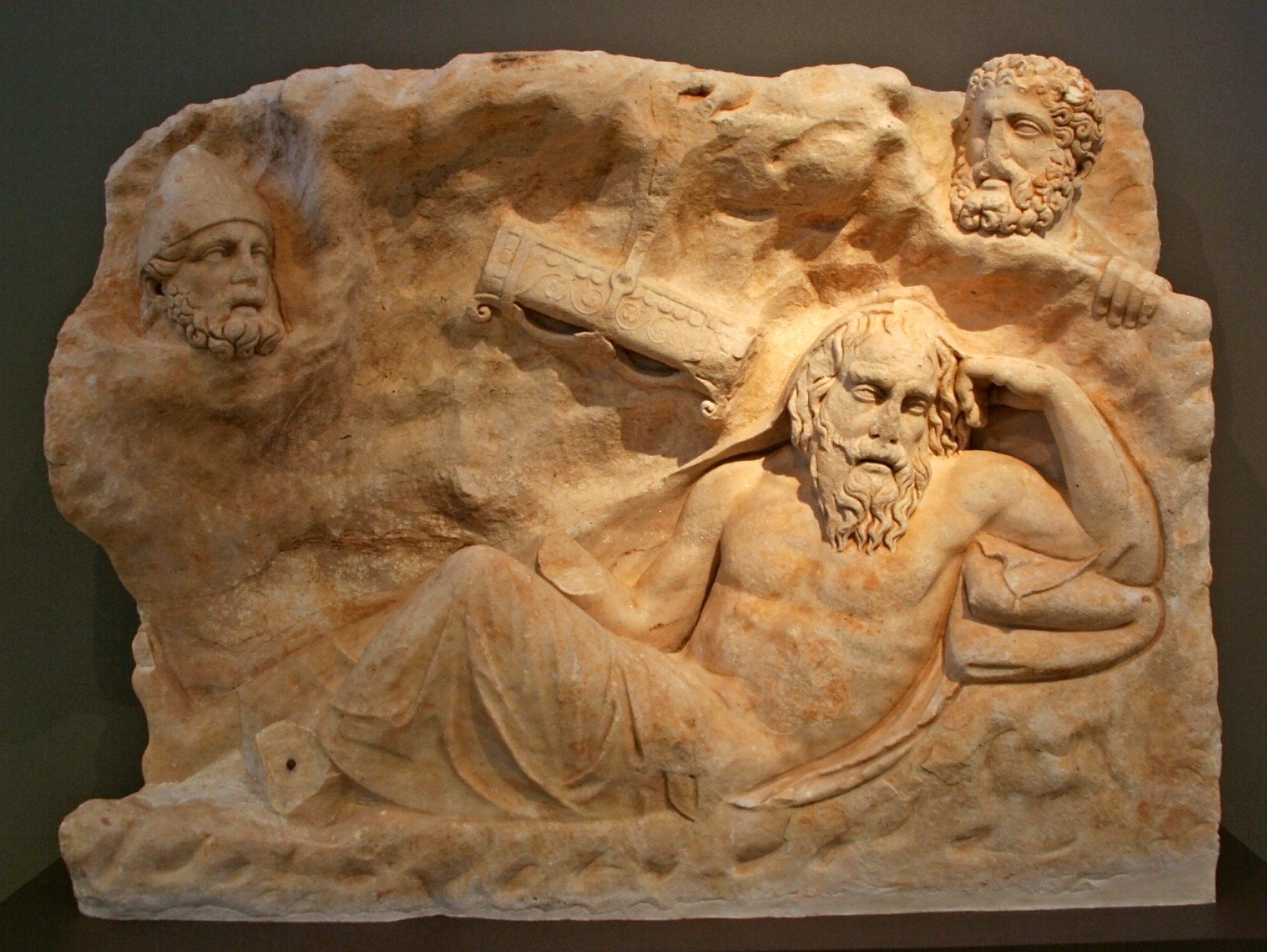
Fragmentary relief, before mid-2nd century AD, depicting the recall of Philoctetes (Archeological Museum of Brauron)

Once back in military company outside Troy, they employed either Machaon the surgeon or more likely Podalirius the physician, both sons of the immortal physician Asclepius, to heal his wound permanently. Philoctetes challenged and would have killed Paris, son of Priam, in single combat were it not for the debates over future Greek strategy. In one version it was Philoctetes who killed Paris. He shot four times: the first arrow went wide; the second struck his bow hand; the third hit him in the right eye; the fourth hit him in the heel, so there was no need of a fifth shot. Philoctetes sided with Neoptolemus about continuing to try to storm the city. They were the only two to think so because they had not had the war-weariness of the prior ten years. Afterward, Philoctetes was among those chosen to hide inside the Trojan Horse, and during the sack of the city he killed many famed Trojans.

According to another myth, Pylius (Πύλιος), the son of god Hephaestus, healed Philoctetes at Lemnos.

Another version has Philoctetes cared for on Lemnos by a shepherd of King Actor named Iphimachus, son of Dolops, until Odysseus and Diomedes come to collect him.

Yet another version has Philoctetes healed by the soil of Lemnos itself. He later helped Euneus, the king of Lemnos, drive out the Carians (Trojan allies) from the smaller Lemnian isles. As a reward, Euneus granted him a portion of land that was later called Akesa. Afterward, he rejoined the Trojan War.

A scholiast commenting on Apollonius's Argonautica lists Philoctetes as one of the male lovers of Heracles.

== Cult and cities ==
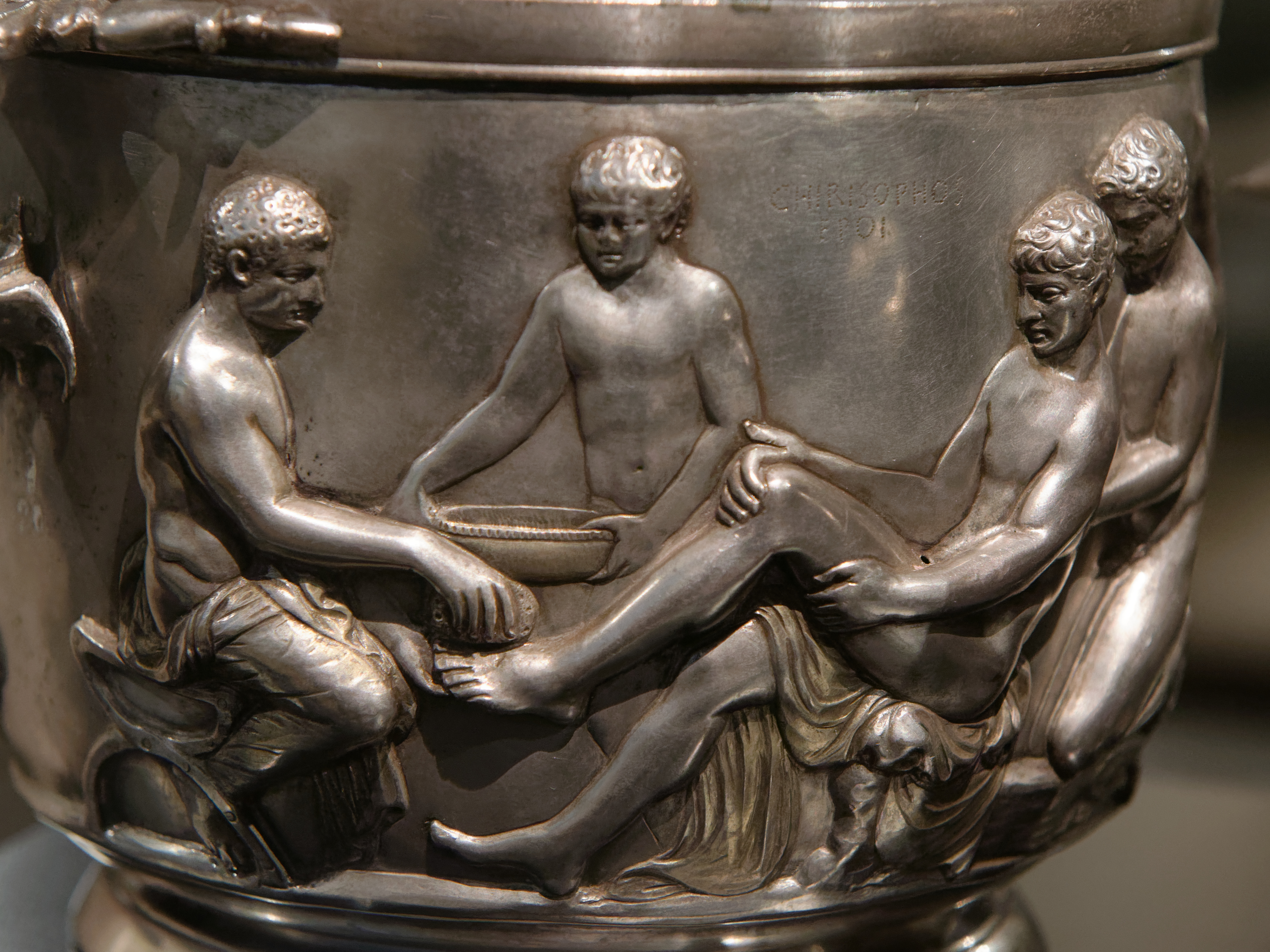
The attempt to cleanse the wounded foot of Philoctetes, depicted on a silver cup from the Hoby treasure (1st century AD)

The author of the Aristotelian Corpus writes that Philoctetes lived at the Macalla after he returned from the Trojan War, and adds that the hero had deposited there in the temple of Apollo Halius the bow and arrows of Hercules, which had, however, been removed by the Crotoniats to the temple of Apollo in their own city. In addition, the author mention that Philoctetes is honored among the Sybarites. According to Lycophron, at Macalla the inhabitants built a great shrine above his grave and glorified him as an everlasting god with libations and sacrifice of oxen.

Justin writes that people say that the city of Thurii was built by Philoctetes and his monument is seen there even to his days, as well as the arrows of Hercules which laid up in the temple of Apollo.

Solinus, Strabo and Virgil write that Petilia was established by Philoctetes.

Strabo writes that also Krimisa and Chone were established by Philoctetes. In addition, Strabo write that some of Philoctetes's companions fortified Aegesta.

On a barren island near Lemnos there was an altar of Philoctetes with a brazen serpent, bows and breastplate bound with strips, to remind of the sufferings of the hero.

== Modern depictions ==
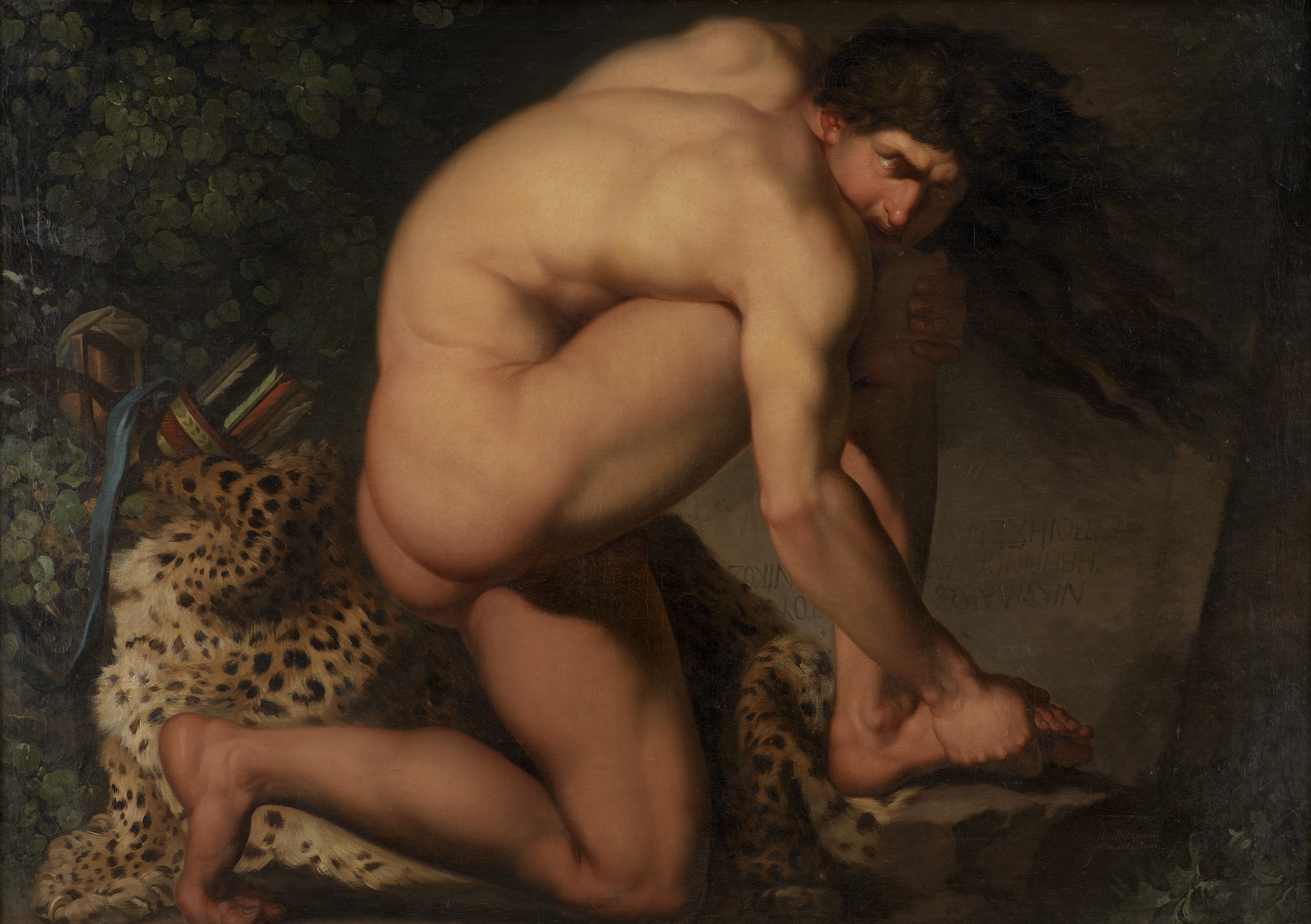
Den sårede Filoktet ("The Wounded Philoctetes") by Nicolai Abildgaard (oil on canvas, 1775)

=== Drama ===
- The legend of Philoctetes was used by André Gide in his play Philoctète.
- The East German postmodern dramatist Heiner Müller produced a successful adaptation of Sophocles' play in 1968 in Munich. It became one of his most-performed plays.
- The Cure at Troy (1991) is an often-quoted adaptation of Sophocles' tragedy by Nobel laureate Seamus Heaney.

=== Poetry ===
- The myth of Philoctetes is the inspiration for William Wordsworth's sonnet "When Philoctetes in the Lemnian Isle," though here the thematic focus is not the Greek warrior's magical bow or gruesome injury, but his abandonment. The poem is about the companionship and solace provided by Nature when all human society has been withdrawn.

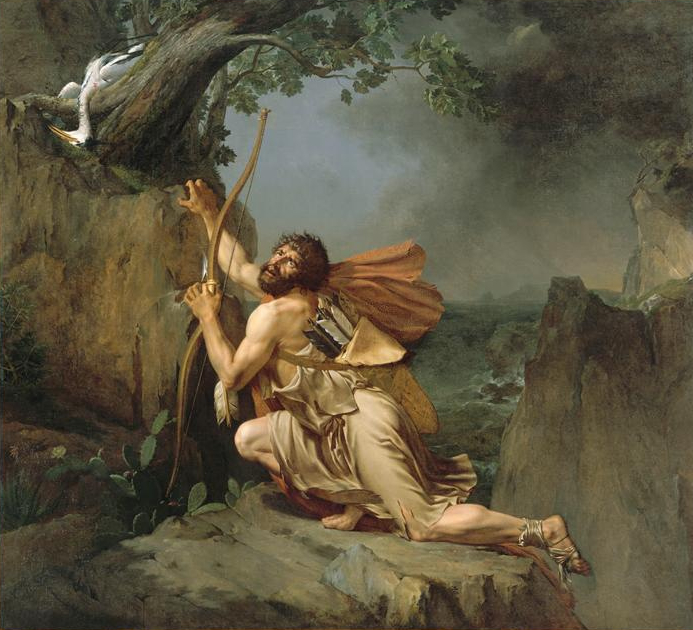
Philoctetes on the Island of Lemnos by Guillaume Guillon-Lethière

=== Painting ===
- Philoctetes on the Island of Lemnos by James Barry, 1770, From A Series of Etchings by James Barry, Esq. from his Original and Justly Celebrated Paintings, in the Great Room of the Society of Arts.
- The Wounded Philoctetes by Nikolaj Abraham Abildgaard, 1775, now in the Statens Museum for Kunst in Copenhagen, which is also used as the front cover for the Penguin Classics edition of the novel Frankenstein by Mary Shelley. (Image).
- Philoctetes on Lemnos by Jean Germain Drouais, 1788, now in the Musée des Beaux-Arts in Chartres (Image).

=== Sculpture ===
- Wounded Philoctetes by Herman Wilhelm Bissen, now in the Ny Carlsberg Glyptotek in Copenhagen (Image).

== See also ==
- Pythagoras (of Rhegium)
