= Angelique Rockas =

South African actress, producer and activist

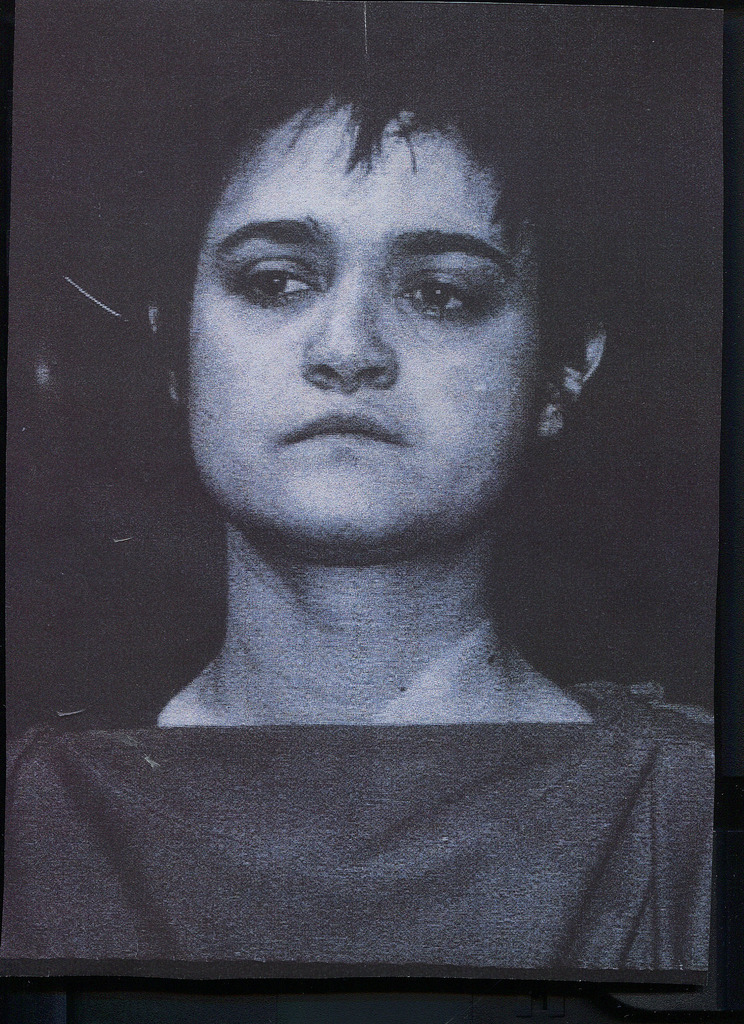
- Angelique Rockas in the role of Medea
- Education: University of the Witwatersrand, University of Cape Town
- Occupations: Actress: stage and film, theatre practitioner and founder of Internationalist Theatre
- Years active: 1978–present

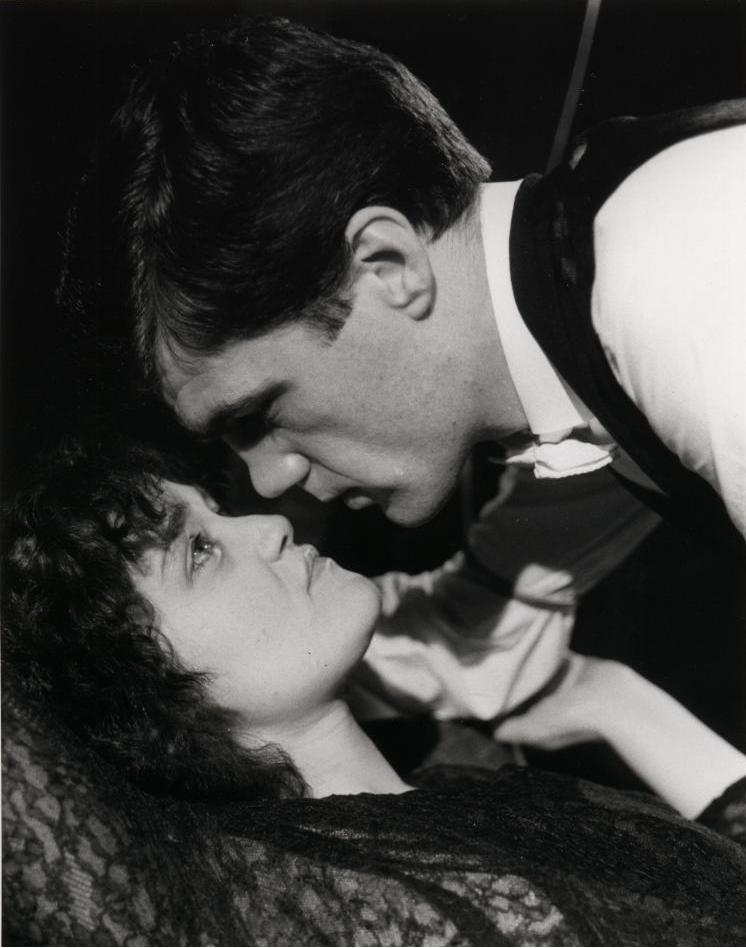
Angelique Rockas as Miss Julie, and Garry Cooper as Jean in Strindberg's Miss Julie, Internationalist Theatre

Angelique Rockas (baptised as Αγγελική Ρόκα) is an actress, producer and activist. Rockas founded the theatre company Internationalist Theatre in the UK with her patron Athol Fugard. The theatre featured multi-racial casts in classical plays."a historic example of theatre work addressing representation in the most valuable manner" As an actress Rockas's work has been characterized by "her strong interpretation of roles".

== Early life ==
Rockas was born and raised in Boksburg, South Africa, to Greek parents who had emigrated from Greece with hopes of finding a better life. She had three siblings, followed Greek Orthodox Christian traditions, and was taught to honour her Greek cultural heritage. She received her early education at St Dominic's Catholic School for Girls, Boksburg, and later earned a bachelor's degree in English literature with a major in philosophy at the University of the Witwatersrand in Johannesburg. After earning a further honours Degree in English literature, Rockas went on to complete an acting course at the Drama School of the University of Cape Town under the direction of Robert Mohr.

A young activist, Rockas appeared on the June 1970 front page of the Star with a group of debutantes raising funds for SAHETI School, a Greek school located in Germiston, South Africa. She also participated in a 25 March Greek War of Independence Poetry Celebration with George Bizos. Bizos nicknamed her "l'enfant terrible" for her resistance to the status quo, and became her role model leading up to her founding of the Internationalist Theatre.

Her activities as an anti-apartheid and feminist activist in “the then underdeveloped and extremely conservative” South Africa eventually motivated her move to the UK. While residing in North London, she worked for Theatro Technis, a Greek Cypriot theatre company that focused on sociopolitical issues affecting Greek Cypriots, and also helped to promote Greek tragedies and comedies to London audiences.

== Acting career ==
In London, Rockas began acting under the direction of George Eugeniou at Theatro Technis where she participated in Greek classical productions.

Rockas also played Io in a production of Prometheus Bound. She also performed under the name of Angeliki in dual language productions (Greek/English) based on improvisations about issues that touched the Greek Cypriot community, and the tragedy of the Turkish invasion of Cyprus, Attilas '74. The plays included Dowry with Two White Doves, Afrodite Unbound, A Revolutionary Nicknamed Roosevelt, "Oh Democracy!",Ethnikos Aravonas. .

In 1982, she made her mark on the London stage playing the lead role in Medea by Euripides as a barefooted refugee, directed by George Eugeniou at Theatro Technis. with The Times critic Ned Chaillet drawing attention "to the wrath of Medea spurned erupting in the dangerous passions of Angelique Rockas".

Rockas performed Lady Macbeth in Shakespeare's Macbeth at the Tramshed Woolwich. She appeared in The F and H Play playing the Nurse at the Traverse Theatre in Edinburgh.

Rockas performed in several productions presented by Internationalist Theatre in London from 1981 to 1985 :

- Carmen in The Balcony,
- Yvette in Brecht's Mother Courage and Her Children,
- Tatiana in Gorky's Enemies,
- Concentration camp victim Emma in the Argentinian anti-junta political drama The Camp by Griselda Gambaro in 1981 . Spare Rib's Jenny Vaughan noted "Angelique Rockas`s Emma is electric ...."
- Miriam in the London premiere of Tennessee Williams's In the Bar of a Tokyo Hotel at the New End Theatre,
- the titular role in Strindberg's Miss Julie in 1984. Rockas challenged casting cliches when as a "short, Latin-looking actress" she was cast as the aristocratic character.

== Film and television ==
On film, Rockas has appeared as the Maintenance Woman in Peter Hyams's Outland, Henrietta in The Witches directed by Nicolas Roeg, and as Nereida in Oh Babylon! directed by Costas Ferris.

In Greece she has played the lead role, Ms Ortiki in Thodoros Maragos's television series Emmones Idees with Vangelis Mourikis as Socratis.

== New Theatre ==
In November 1980, Rockas set up the performance of 'Tis Pity She's a Whore by John Ford in which she played the lead part of Annabella. She financed the production herself and enlisted the then unknown Declan Donnellan to direct the play to be performed at London's Half Moon Theatre and Theatre Space. The production was designed by Nick Ormerod.

== Internationalist Theatre ==
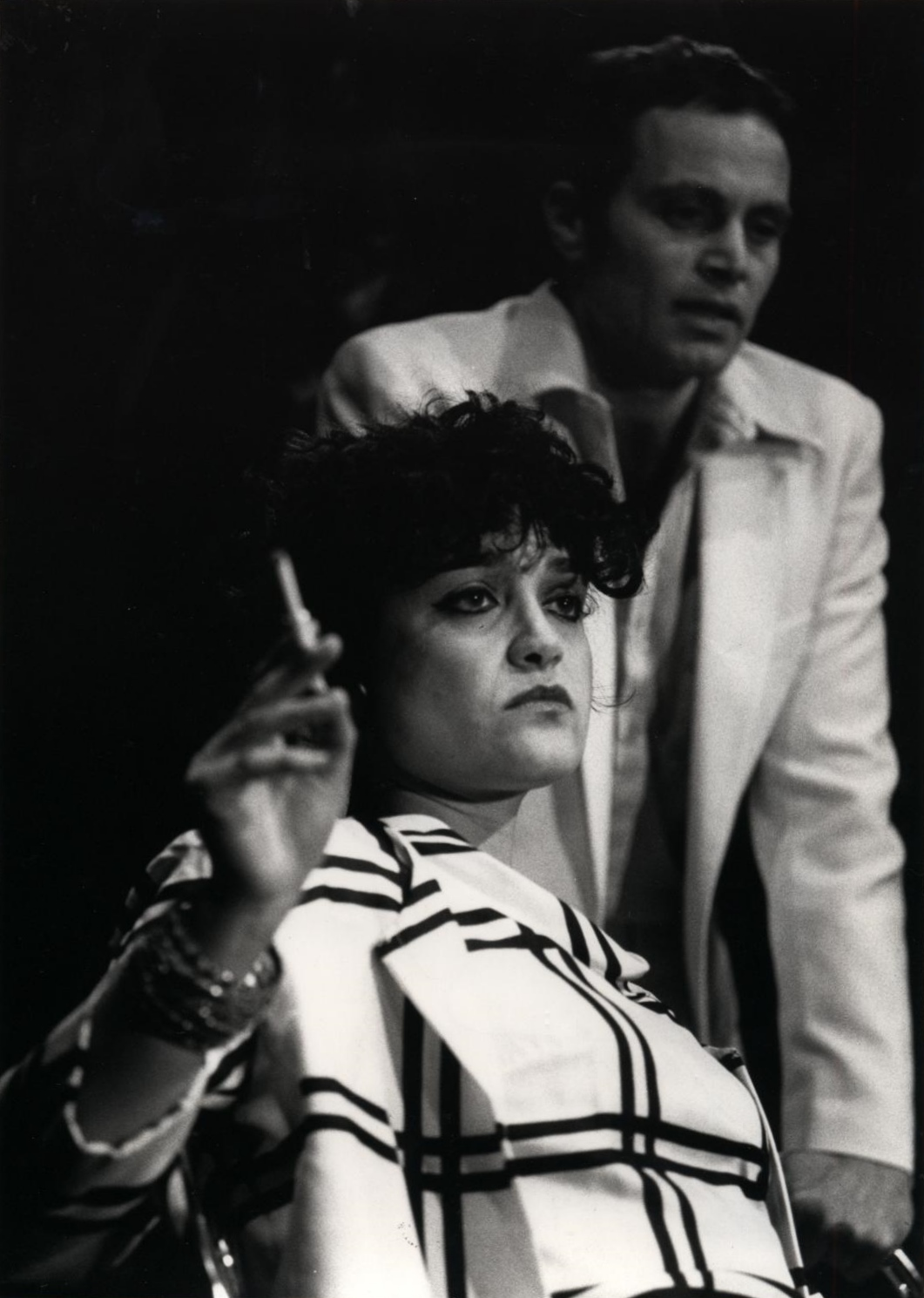
Angelique Rockas as Miriam, In the Bar of a Tokyo Hotel

In April 1981, Rockas founded Internationalist Theatre to create a multi-racial and multi-national theatre company for actors living in London of any racial or national background, of any accent, performing drama classics as well as contemporary works not especially written for multi-racial and multi-national casts. It was first announced on 9 April 1981 in the Theatre News, page (2), by the editor of The Stage, describing the company's formation "to assert a multi-racial drama policy", with their performance of the revival of The Balcony by Jean Genet.

Internationalist Theatre staged productions by dramatists including Pirandello, Genet, and Tennessee Williams who belong to "the continental, non-realistic, symbolically orientated drama of this century (20th) and..proved most uncongenial to the tunnel visioned repertoire builders" of British theatre of that period.

== Personal life ==
Rockas is an Orthodox Christian, and creates fabric art works some of which are at the Benaki Museum in Athens.

== Archives ==
- The Paper records of Rockas' work as an actress and founder/artistic director of Internationalist Theatre and correspondence with Joan Littlewood, Athol Fugard, Michael Meyer, George Bizos are held at the British Library under Western Manuscripts.
- The Digital record of Rockas' work as an actress and theatre practitioner are now also held at The British Library
- The Angelique Rockas Archive of Correspondence with film directors including: Elia Kazan, Derek Jarman, Lindsay Anderson, Costas Gavras, and with actress Julie Christie about Yugoslavia/Kosovo film project is now held at the British Film Institute BFI and at The National Archives (United Kingdom).The Discovery Service
- Bertolt-Brecht-Archiv Akademie der Künste Informationen zu Angelique Rockas Gründerin der Theatercompagnie Internationalist Theatre
- The National Library of South Africa
