= Jorge Liderman =

American composer (1957–2008)

Jorge Mario Liderman (November 16, 1957 – February 3, 2008) was an Argentine and American composer. He was awarded the Guggenheim Fellowship in 2003 to partially fund a new work for Duo46 titled Aires de Sefarad: 46 Spanish Songs for Violin and Guitar. Jorge went on to compose a second set of 46 songs for Duo46 titled Aires de Sefarad II shortly before his death in 2008. He taught composition at the University of California, Berkeley.

== Life ==
Jorge Liderman was born in Buenos Aires, Argentina, in 1957. He studied at the Rubin School of Music in Jerusalem and earned a doctorate in composition from the University of Chicago in 1988. He joined the faculty of the University of California, Berkeley, in 1989.

He died February 3, 2008, in an apparent suicide, struck by an incoming train at the El Cerrito Plaza Bay Area Rapid Transit (BART) station in El Cerrito.

== Selected works ==
=== Orchestral ===
- Shir Eres (1984)
- Song of Songs (2001), cantata for soprano, tenor, female chorus & chamber orchestra
- Open Strings for guitar orchestra & electric bass

=== Operatic ===
- Antigona Furiosa (1991), libretto by the composer after the drama by Griselda Gambaro, performed at the third Munich Biennale

=== Chamber ===
- Aires de Sefarad (2004) - 46 Sephardic songs for Duo46, violin and guitar
- Aires de Sefarad II (2007) - 46 Sephardic songs for Duo46, violin and guitar
- Draft (1998) for piano, violin and tuned percussion
- Furthermore. . . (2006) concerto for violin and chamber ensemble
- Piano Quintet (2002)
- Puncti, Belly, Etc., Etc... (1986)
- String Quartet No. 1 (1985)
- String Quartet No. 3 (1994)
- Swirling Streams, for guitar, bass clarinet & string trio
- That is already... for solo piano
- Tropes IV (1994) for solo piano
- Walking Dances for David Tanenbaum, guitar
- Wind Up Toys for two pianos
- Yzkor (1991)
