= Postmodern theatre =

Style of theatre influenced by postmodern philosophy

Postmodern theatre is a recent phenomenon in world theatre, coming as it does out of the postmodern philosophy that originated in Europe in the middle of the twentieth century. Postmodern theatre emerged as a reaction against modernist theatre. Most postmodern productions are centered on highlighting the fallibility of definite truth, instead encouraging the audience to reach their own individual understanding. Essentially, thus, postmodern theatre raises questions rather than attempting to supply answers.

== Postmodern techniques ==
A postmodern theatrical production might make use of some or all of the following techniques:

1. The accepted norms of seeing and representing the world are challenged and disregarded, while experimental theatrical perceptions and representations are created.
2. A pastiche of different textualities and media forms are used, including the simultaneous use of multiple art or media forms, and there is the 'theft' of a heterogeneous group of artistic forms.
3. The narrative needs not be complete but can be broken, paradoxical and imagistic. There is a movement away from linearity to multiplicity (to inter-related webs of stories), where acts and scenes give way to a series of peripatetic dramatic moments.
4. Characters are fragmented, forming a collection of contrasting and parallel shards stemming from a central idea, theme or traditional character.
5. Each new performance of a theatrical pieces is a new Gestalt, a unique spectacle, with no intent on methodically repeating a play.
6. The audience is integral to the shared meaning-making of the performance process and its members are included in the dialogue of the play.
7. There is a rejection of the notions of "High" and "Low" art. The production exists only in the viewer's mind as what the viewer interprets – nothing more and nothing less.
8. The rehearsal process in a theatrical production is driven more by shared meaning-making and improvisation, rather than the scripted text.
9. The play steps back from reality to create its own self-conscious atmosphere. This is sometimes referred to as metatheatre.

While these techniques are often found in postmodern productions they are never part of a centralised movement or style. Rather, they are tools for authentic introspection, questioning and representation of human experience.

== Notable examples of postmodern theatre ==
- Griselda Gambaro's Information For Foreigners
- Ozono Production's Fuerzabruta
- Heiner Müller's Hamletmachine
- Magda Romanska's "Opheliamachine"
- Dimitris Lyacos's With the People from the Bridge
- Reza Abdoh's "Quotations from a Ruined City"
- Dummies Theatre
- Peter Handke, Sprechstück (1966)

== See also ==
- Postmodernism
- Postmodernity
- Poststructuralism
- Category:Postmodern theatre
