= The Balcony =

Play written by Jean Genet

The Balcony (French: Le Balcon) is a play by the French dramatist Jean Genet. It is set in an unnamed city that is experiencing a revolutionary uprising in the streets; most of the action takes place in an upmarket brothel that functions as a microcosm of the regime of the establishment under threat outside.

Since Peter Zadek directed the first English-language production at the Arts Theatre Club in London in 1957, the play has been revived frequently (in various versions) and has attracted many prominent directors, including Peter Brook, Erwin Piscator, Roger Blin, Giorgio Strehler, and JoAnne Akalaitis. It has been adapted as a film and given operatic treatment. The play's dramatic structure integrates Genet's concern with meta-theatricality and role-playing, and consists of two central strands: a political conflict between revolution and counter-revolution and a philosophical one between reality and illusion. Genet suggested that the play should be performed as a "glorification of the Image and the Reflection."

Genet's biographer Edmund White wrote that with The Balcony, along with The Blacks (1959), Genet re-invented modern theatre. The psychoanalyst Jacques Lacan described the play as the rebirth of the spirit of the classical Athenian comic playwright Aristophanes, while the philosopher Lucien Goldmann argued that despite its "entirely different world view" it constitutes "the first great Brechtian play in French literature." Martin Esslin has called The Balcony "one of the masterpieces of our time."

== Synopsis ==
Most of the action takes place in an upmarket brothel in which its madam, Irma, "casts, directs, and co-ordinates performances in a house of infinite mirrors and theaters." Genet uses this setting to explore roles of power in society; in the first few scenes patrons assume the roles of a bishop who forgives a penitent, a judge who punishes a thief, and a general who rides his horse. Meanwhile, a revolution is progressing outside in the city and the occupants of the brothel anxiously await the arrival of the Chief of Police. Chantal, one of the prostitutes, has quit the brothel to become the embodiment of the spirit of the revolution. An Envoy from the Queen arrives and reveals that the pillars of society (the Chief Justice, the Bishop, the General, etc.) have all been killed in the uprising. Using the costumes and props in Irma's "house of illusions", the patrons' roles are realised when they pose in public as the figures of authority in a counter-revolutionary effort to restore order and the status quo.

== Characters ==
- Irma (Queen)
- Carmen
- Chief of Police
- Court Envoy
- Torturer (Arthur)
- Bishop
- Judge
- General
- Bishop's Girl (Rosine)
- Thief (Marlyse)
- General's Girl (Elyane)
- Beggar/Slave
- Beggar's Girl
- Blood (1st Photographer)
- Tears (2nd Photographer)
- Sperm (3rd Photographer)
- Chantal
- Georgette
- Roger
- Armand
- Luke
- Mark
- Wounded Man

== Textual history ==
The Balcony exists in three distinct versions, published in French in 1956, 1960, and 1962. The first version consists of two acts of fifteen scenes and includes a dream sequence in which Irma's dream of three wounded young men—who personify blood, tears, and sperm—is enacted immediately before Arthur returns to the brothel and is abruptly shot. The second version is the longest and most political. The third version is shorter and reduces the political content of the scene with the café revolutionaries. Bernard Frechtman's first English translation (published in 1958) was based on Genet's second version, while Frechtman's second, revised English translation (published in 1966) was based on Genet's third version. A translation by Barbara Wright and Terry Hands, which the RSC used in its 1987 production, incorporates scenes and elements from all three versions.

Genet wrote the first version of the play between January and September 1955, during which time he also wrote The Blacks and re-worked his screenplay The Penal Colony. Immediately afterwards, in October and November the same year, he wrote Her, a posthumously published one-act play about the pope, which is related to The Balcony. Genet took his initial inspiration for The Balcony from Franco's Spain, explaining in a 1957 article that:

My point of departure was situated in Spain, Franco's Spain, and the revolutionary who castrates himself was all those Republicans when they had admitted their defeat. And then my play continued to grow in its own direction and Spain in another.

Genet was particularly interested at the time in newspaper reports of two projects for massive tombs: the Caudillo's own colossal memorial near Madrid, the Valle de los Caídos ("Valley of the Fallen"), where he was buried in 1975, and the projected mausoleum of Aga Khan III in Aswan, Egypt. They provided the source for the Chief of Police's longing for a great mausoleum and the founding of a funerary cult around him in the play. The meditations on the contrast between Being and Doing that the Bishop articulates in the first scene recall the "two irreducible systems of values" that Jean-Paul Sartre suggested in Saint Genet (1952) Genet "uses simultaneously to think about the world."

Marc Barbezat's company L'Arbalète published the first version of The Balcony in June 1956; the artist Alberto Giacometti created several lithographs based on the play that appeared on its cover (including a tall, dignified Irma, the Bishop who was made to resemble Genet, and the General with his whip). Genet dedicated this version to Pierre Joly, a young actor and Genet's lover at the time. Genet began to re-write the play in late October 1959 and again in May 1960, the latter prompted by its recent production under the direction of Peter Brook. He worked on the third version between April and October 1961, during which time he also read Friedrich Nietzsche's The Birth of Tragedy (1872), a work of dramatic theory that was to become one of Genet's favourite books and a formative influence on his ideas about the role of myth and ritual in post-realist theatre.

== Production history ==
=== 1950s ===
In a note of 1962, Genet writes that: "In London, at the Arts Theatre, I saw for myself that The Balcony was badly acted. It was equally badly acted in New York, Berlin and Paris – so I was told." The play received its world première in London on 22 April 1957, in a production directed by Peter Zadek at the Arts Theatre Club, a "private theatre club" that enabled the production to circumvent the Lord Chamberlain's ban on public performances of the play (though the censor still insisted that what he considered to be blasphemous references to Christ, the Virgin, the Immaculate Conception and Saint Theresa be cut, along with the failed revolutionary Roger's castration near the end of the play). It featured Selma Vaz Dias as Irma and Hazel Penwarden as Chantal. Genet himself participated in the theatrics during the opening-night performance when he accused Zadek of the "attempted murder" of his play and attempted to obstruct the performance physically, but police officers prevented him from entering the theatre. Genet objected to what he called its "Folies Bergère"-style mise en scène. The production was well-received for the most part. Two years later in 1959 the play was produced at the Schlosspark-Theater in Berlin under the direction of Hans Lietzau. This production utilised a colour TV set for Irma's surveillance and switchboard machine.

=== 1960s ===
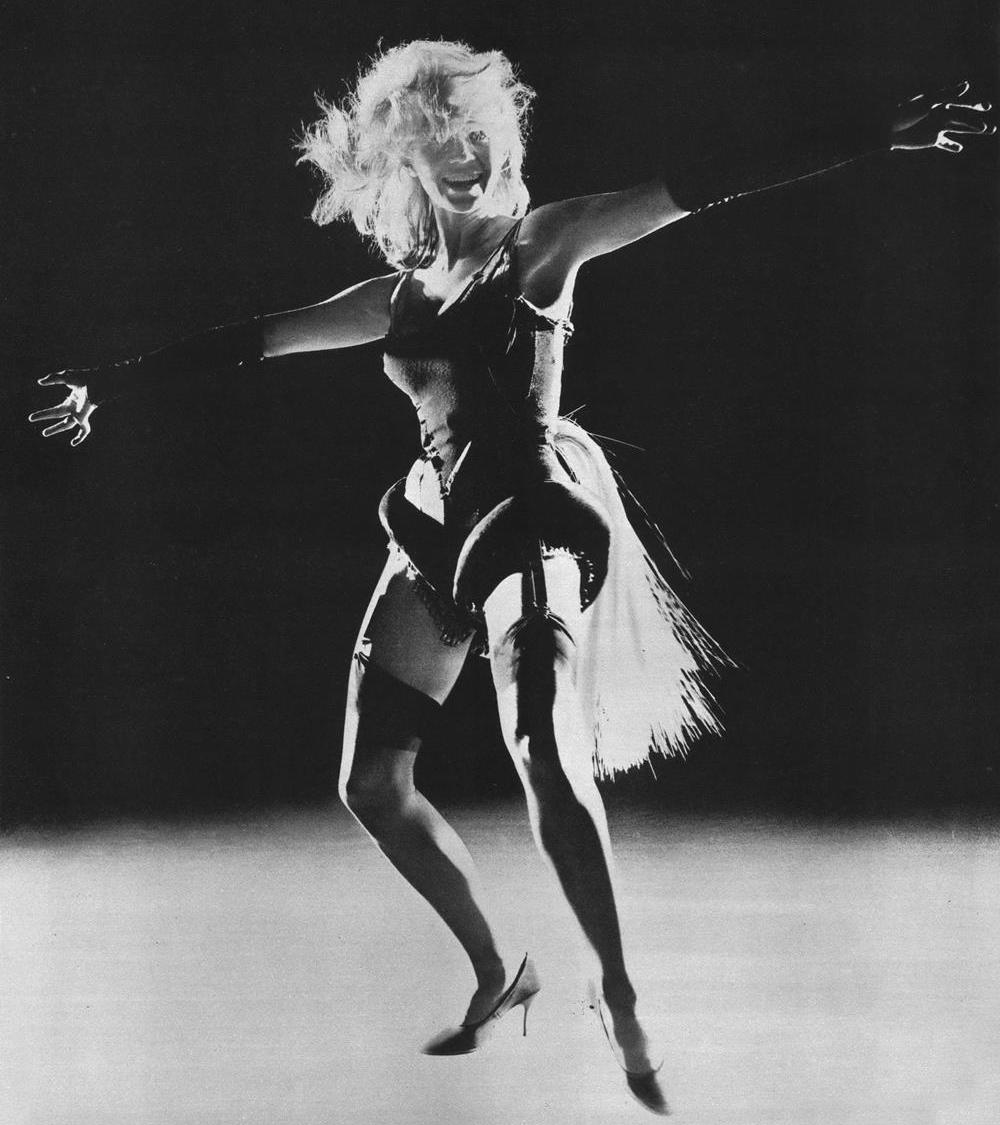
Salome Jens as Elyane in the Circle in the Square Theatre production, circa February 1961

The first New York production opened Off-Broadway in a theatre in the round production at the Circle in the Square Downtown on 3 March 1960. This production was directed by José Quintero, who shortened the text considerably, and featured Nancy Marchand as Irma (who was replaced by Grayson Hall), Roy Poole as the Chief of Police, Betty Miller as Carmen, Jock Livingston as the Envoy, Arthur Malet as the Judge, Sylvia Miles as Marlyse, and Salome Jens as Elyane. The production was very well-received and won the 1960 Obie Awards for Genet for Best Foreign Play, for David Hays for its scenic design, and a Distinguished Performance award for both Livingston and Marchand; the production became what was at the time the longest-running Off-Broadway play in history, with 672 performances.

Peter Brook had planned to direct the play in 1958 at the Théâtre Antoine in Paris, until he was forced to postpone when the theatre's artistic director, Simone Berriau, was threatened by the Parisian police. Brook recounts:

For while she was with the police, a hand beckoned her into an inner room and she was told, off the record, that if she proceeded with this play, a riot would be organized (by the police, naturally!) and the theatre would be closed. This incidentally was a play that had run in London without scandal, but as it showed a priest and a general in a brothel it was more than the French could take.

Brook eventually directed the play's French première two years later, which opened on 18 May 1960 at the Théâtre du Gymnase in Paris. The production featured Marie Bell as Irma, Loleh Bellon as Carmen, and Roger Blin as the Envoy. Brook designed the sets, which used a revolve for the first few scenes in the brothel. The scene in the café with the revolutionaries was cut and many of Genet's cruder words were omitted because the actresses refused to speak them; Genet objected to both decisions, as well as the use of a revolve. Public reaction to Brook's production was mixed. Lucien Goldmann thought that Brook's naturalistic decor and acting style (with the exception of Blin and Muselli's performances) obscured the play's "symbolic, universal character" (which an epic design, he suggests via a comparison with Mother Courage and Her Children, and defamiliarised mode of acting would have foregrounded), while Brook's decision to transform the set only once (dividing the play into a period of order and one of disorder) distorted the play's tripartite structure (of order, disorder, and the re-establishment of order). The production prompted Genet to re-write the play.

Leon Epp directed a production in 1961 at the Volkstheater in Vienna, which subsequently transferred to Paris. Erwin Piscator directed a production at the Städtische Bühnen Frankfurt, which opened on 31 March 1962 with scenic design by Johannes Waltz and music by Aleida Montijn. A production opened in Boston in November 1966, while Roger Blin, who had played the Envoy in Brook's 1960 production, directed the play in Rotterdam in April 1967. In Britain, the Oxford Playhouse also produced the play in 1967, under the direction of Minos Volanakis, a friend of Genet's who, working under a pseudonym, also designed the sets. His scenic design utilised Melinex to create a "a revolving labyrinth of silver foil mirrors."

Victor Garcia directed a production at the Ruth Escobar Theatre in São Paulo in 1969, which Genet saw in July 1970. The production was staged under the new regime of Brazil's military dictator General Garrastazu Médici; the actress who played Chantal, Nilda Maria, was arrested for anti-government activities and her children were sent to Public Welfare, prompting Genet to petition the wife of the city's governor for their release. In Garcia's production, the audience observed the action from vertiginous balconies overlooking a pierced 65' plastic and steel tunnel; the actors performed on platforms within the tunnel, or clinging to its sides, or on the metal ladders that led from one platform to another, creating the impression of animals driven insane within the cages of a zoo. The aim, Garcia explained, was to make the public feel as though it was suspended in a void, with "nothing in front of it nor behind it, only precipices." It won 13 critics' awards in the country and ran for 20 months. As already mentioned, Garcia's boldness and endeavour led to the arrival of Jean Genet to Brazil in 1970, that considered this production the best montage of his text — making it an international reference to the genetians studies.

Antoine Bourseiller directed the play twice, in Marseilles in 1969 and Paris in 1975. Genet saw Bourseiller's first production in February 1969, which set the scenes with the revolutionaries inside Irma's brothel and cast non-actors in the leading roles, including Bourseiller's wife, Chantal Darget, as Irma. Writing to the cast, Genet advised: "You can break it [the play] into pieces and then glue them back together, but make sure that it holds together." Genet wrote many letters at that time to Bourseiller about the art of acting.

=== 1970s ===
The Royal Shakespeare Company staged the play at the Aldwych Theatre, London, opening on 25 November 1971 with Brenda Bruce as Irma, Estelle Kohler as Carmen, and Barry Stanton as the Chief of Police; its director was Terry Hands and its designer was Farrah. The RSC premièred another production, with the same director and designer, on 9 July 1987 at the Barbican Theatre, in a translation by Barbara Wright and Terry Hands. Dilys Laye played Irma, Kathryn Pogson played Carmen, and Joe Melia played the Chief of Police in this production. On both occasions the RSC performed a version of the play that incorporated scenes and elements from Genet's texts of 1956 and 1960 that do not appear in the French edition of 1962. This version was also used in a production at the Abbey Theatre in New York, which opened on 4 December 1976 and featured Karen Sunde as Irma, Ara Watson as Carmen (later replaced by Carol Fleming), Tom Donaldson as the Chief of Police, and Christopher Martin as the Envoy.

Giorgio Strehler directed a production at the Piccolo Teatro in Milan in 1976. Richard Schechner directed an "updated" version with The Performance Group in New York in 1979. He transformed the revolution into another fantasy staged in the brothel (as Bourseiller had done ten years earlier in Marseilles) and made Roger shoot Chantel when he realises that she still belongs to the brothel.

=== 1980s ===
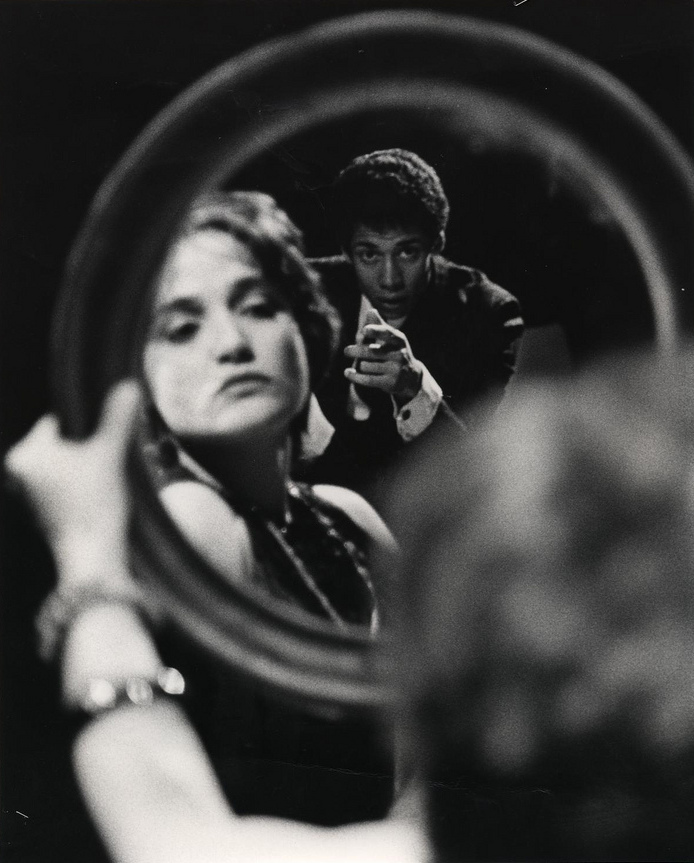
Angelique Rockas and Okon Jones as Carmen and Arthur in a 1981 performance of the play at the Internationalist Theatre in London

July 1981, London . In the middle of the 1981 Brixton riot Internationalist Theatre staged a multi-racial performance of Genet's revolutionary play featuring the Sierra Leonean actress Ellen Thomas in the role of Irma,"While the ruling classes, the icons and figureheads fiddle, society burns around them...a comment on power and political manoeuvre" ... thought provoking .." The cast included French actor Yves Aubert as the General and Angelique Rockas as Carmen .The production data are archived at Institute_for_Contemporary_Publishing_Archives

The Finnish Broadcasting Company's (YLE) television theatre produced a television adaptation of the Balcony in 1982, directed by Arto af Hällström and Janne Kuusi.

The Balcony was the first play by Genet that the Comédie-Française staged, although he neither attended rehearsals nor saw it performed there; the production opened on 14 December 1985, under the direction of Georges Lavaudant.

JoAnne Akalaitis directed the play in a translation by Jean-Claude van Itallie at the American Repertory Theater (on their Loeb Stage) in Cambridge, Massachusetts, which opened on 15 January 1986, with choreography by Johanna Boyce, sets by George Tsypin, costume design by Kristi Zea and music by Rubén Blades. Akalaitis set the play in a Central American republic and added a "Marcos"-figure (played by Tim McDonough) as the leader of the revolutionaries. Joan MacIntosh played Irma, Diane D'Aquila played Carmen, Harry S. Murphy played the Chief of Police, and Jeremy Geidt played the Envoy.

=== 1990s ===
Geoffrey Sherman directed a production at the Hudson Guild Theater in New York in 1990. Angela Sargeant played Irma, Freda Foh Shen played Carmen, Sharon Washington played the Envoy, and Will Rhys played the Chief of Police, while Paul Wonsek designed the sets and lighting. The Jean Cocteau Repertory company produced the play at the Bouwerie Lane Theatre in New York in 1999. Eve Adamson directed and designed the lighting, while Robert Klingelhoffer designed the sets. Elise Stone played Irma, Craig Smith played the Chief of Police, and Jason Crowl played the Envoy.

In 1993, Chinese avant-garde theatre director Meng Jinghui (b. 1964) staged the play at Central Experimental Theatre in Beijing. While the failed revolutionary in the play recalls the doomed democratic demonstrations on Tiananmen Square in the spring of 1989, the focus on “play within the play” also exposes the fraudulent nature of politics and expresses a strong sense of disillusion and disbelief.

=== 2000s ===
Sébastien Rajon directed the play at the Théâtre de l'Athénée in Paris, opening on 11 May 2005. Patrick Burnier designed the sets and Michel Fau played Irma, Frédéric Jessau played the Chief of Police, Xavier Couleau played the Envoy, and Marjorie de Larquier played Carmen. The director performed the role of the slave.

=== Audiobook ===
An audiobook of the production with Patrick Magee, Cyril Cusack and Pamela Brown was recorded as an LP by conductor Howard Sackler and released by Caedmon Records in 1967.

== Analysis and criticism ==
The philosopher Lucien Goldmann suggests that the themes of The Balcony may be divided between those that are essential and primary and those that are non-essential and secondary. Those that we may recognise from Genet's earlier work—the double, the mirror, sexuality, dream-death vs. reality-impure life—belong to the secondary level, he argues, while the play's essential theme is a clear and comprehensible analysis of the transformation of industrial society into a technocracy. Genet relates the experiences of his characters "to the great political and social upheavals of the twentieth century," Goldmann argues, particularly important among which is "the collapse of the tremendous hopes for revolution." He discerns in the play's dramatic structure a balance of three equal movements—"established order, threat to order, and order again re-established." The first section of the play dramatises the way in which the prestigious images of the established order—the Bishop, the Judge, the General—belie the actual bearers of power in modern society:

Genet employs the image of a house of ilusions, a brothel, in which, it must however be recalled, sexuality plays almost no role, and in which we are principally shown the desire for power...The first scenes show us three typical specimens...What is common to their three dreams is that, contrary to what we will later see to be the social reality, they still confuse prestige with power and identify one with the other.

Irma and the Chief of Police "possess the real power," Goldmann points out; they "represent the two essential aspects of technocracy: the organization of an enterprise and the power of the State." Consequently, the Chief of Police's dilemma dramatises the historical process of "the growth in prestige of the technicians of repression in the consciousness of the great masses of people." The subject of the play is the transformation by means of which "the Chief of Police comes to be part of the fantasies of power of the people who do not possess it." This process is borne by Roger, the revolutionary leader whose downfall forms part of the third section:

Roger the plumber comes to the house of illusions—like those who earlier had dreamed of being Judge, Bishop or General—to live out for a few hours his dream of being a technician of power. Yet by doing that, Genet tells us, the revolutionary who dreams of being Chief of Police castrates himself as a revolutionary.

To the extent that "realism" is understood as "the effort to bring to light the essential relationships that at a particular moment govern both the development of the whole of social relations and—through the latter—the development of individual destinies and the psychological life of individuals," Goldmann argues that The Balcony has a realist structure and characterises Genet as "a very great realist author":

One may disagree with the lack of hope that prevails in Genet's play. But it would be difficult to deny that it is perfectly realistic insofar as it transposes onto the literary level the fundamental transformations that modern society has undergone over the past forty years, and also that it does this in a particularly clear and comprehensible manner.

While Goldmann detects an "extremely strong" Brechtian influence in The Balcony, Carol Rosen characterises Genet's dramaturgy as "Artaudian." "Just as Mme. Irma's brothel is the intangible shadow of a real social phenomenon," she suggests, "her closet dramas are the Artaudian double of their impotent bases in truth." Rosen reads Irma's brothel as "a metaphysical construct in a discussion play about the value of mimetic ritual, the transcendence possible in play, and the |magical efficacy of the theater itself"; it is "more than a naturalistically ordered stage brothel; it is more than real; it expresses conflicting ideas with the erotic nuances of a dream." In line with Genet's interest in Nietzsche's The Birth of Tragedy (1872), Rosen aligns the development of Irma's relationship to the audience with the mythic narrative of Dionysos toying with Pentheus in Euripides' tragedy The Bacchae (405 BCE). In contrast to Goldmann's analysis of the play as an epic defamiliarisation of the historical rise of technocracy, Rosen sees The Balcony as a theatre of cruelty staging of "a mythic dimension to the dark side of the human soul." Like Goldmann, J. L. Styan, too, detects the influence of Brechtian defamiliarisation in the play, which he reads as a "political examination of how man chooses his role in society." Styan argues that—despite the symbolism of evil and the sensational, emotionally disturbing staging of the secret desires of its audience—there is in Genet's theatre "a sharp intellectual edge, a shocking clear-headedness" that "links him more with Pirandello than with Artaud."

Genet's theatre, the editors of Jean Genet: Performance and Politics argue, stages an interrogation and deconstruction of "the value and status of the theatrical frame itself." Postmodern performance, though, provides the most appropriate frame of reference for understanding it, they suggest. They observe that, in common with his other late dramas, The Blacks (1959) and The Screens (1964), The Balcony's exploration of explosive political issues appears to contradict its author's calls for a "non-historical, mythical stage." They interpret The Balcony as an examination of "how revolutions are appropriated through mass-media manipulation." Taking their cue from Genet's note on the play from 1960, they conclude that Genet felt that "conventional political theatre too often indulges the spectator by depicting the revolution as having already happened. Instead of encouraging the audience to change the world, it acts as a safety valve, and thus works to support the status quo." His is a form of political theatre that is "neither didactic nor based on realism"; instead, it fuses the metaphysical or sacred and the political and constitutes the most successful articulation to date of "post-modernist performance and Brechtian critical theatre." It "shows us that performance is not divorced from reality," they suggest, but rather that it is "productive of reality."

== Adaptations ==
In November 1961, Genet met the American film director Joseph Strick, with whom he agreed to a cinematic adaption of the play. The film version of The Balcony was released in 1963, directed by Strick. It starred Shelley Winters, Peter Falk, Lee Grant and Leonard Nimoy. The film garnered nominations for George J. Folsey for an Academy Award for Best Cinematography and for Ben Maddow for a Writers Guild of America Award.

Robert DiDomenica composed an operatic version of the play in 1972, though it did not receive its première until Sarah Caldwell of the Opera Company of Boston produced it in 1990. Having seen the New York production of the play in 1960, DiDomenica based his libretto on Bernard Frechtman's revised translation of 1966, though he did not acquire the rights to do so until shortly before Genet's death, in 1986. A reviewer for The New York Times found the production "a wonderfully intelligent construct, overlaid with a lyrical and dramatic sensibility that makes searing emotional contact at many crucial points." Mignon Dunn played Irma and Susan Larson played Carmen.

In 2001/02, the Hungarian composer Peter Eötvös created an opera based on the French version of the play. It was staged for the first time at the Festival d'Aix en Provence on 5 July 2002. It was produced again in 2014 at the Théâtre de l'Athénée, in Paris by the orchestra le balcon.

== Sources ==
- Atkinson, Brooks. 1960. "Work by Genet Opens at Circle in Square." The New York Times March 4, 1960. 21. Available online.
- Brook, Peter. 1987. The Shifting Point: Forty Years of Theatrical Exploration, 1946–1987. London: Methuen. ISBN 0-413-61280-5.
- Bruckner, D. J. R. 1999. "Untangling Genet's Puzzle Of Power, Lost and Found." The New York Times Friday November 19, 1999. Available online.
- Chapman, Don. 2008. Oxford Playhouse: High and Low Drama in a University City. Hatfield: University of Hertfordshire Press. ISBN 1-902806-87-5.
- Dichy, Albert. 1993. "Chronology." In White (1993, xiii–xxxv).
- Genet, Jean. 1960. "Note." In Wright and Hands (1991, xiv).
- ---. 1962. "How To Perform The Balcony." In Wright and Hands (1991, xi–xiii).
- Goldmann, Lucien. 1960. "Genet's The Balcony: A Realist Play." Trans. Robert Sayre. Praxis: A Journal of Radical Perspectives on the Arts 4 (1978): 123–131. Trans. of "Une Pièce réaliste: Le Balcon de Genet" in Les Temps Modernes 171 (June 1960).
- Gussow, Mel. 1990. "Balcony: The Fantasy Within a Fantasy". The New York Times, April 9, 1990. Available online.
- Holmberg, Arthur. 1986. Review. Performing Arts Journal 10.1: 43–46.
- Lavery, Carl, Clare Finburgh, and Maria Shevtsova, eds. 2006. Jean Genet: Performance and Politics. Baisingstoke and New York: Palgrave Macmillan. ISBN 1-4039-9480-3.
- Mostaço, Edelcio. O Balcão. Palco e Platéia, São Paulo, year 1, nº. 4, December 1986.
- Oestreich, James R. (June 17, 1990). "Review/Music; Jean Genet's 'Balcony' Makes Debut as Opera". The New York Times.
- Oswald, Laura. 1989. Jean Genet and the Semiotics of Performance, Advances in Semiotics ser. Bloomington and Indianapolis: Indiana University Press. ISBN 0-253-33152-8.
- Rich, Frank. 1986. Review. The New York Times, Thursday, January 23, 1986. Available online.
- Rosen, Carol. 1992. "The Structure of Illusion in Genet's The Balcony." Modern Drama 35.4 (December): 513–519.
- Savona, Jeannette L. 1983. Jean Genet. Grove Press Modern Dramatists ser. New York: Grove Press. ISBN 0-394-62045-3.
- Styan, J. L. 1981. Symbolism, Surrealism and the Absurd. Vol. 2 of Modern Drama in Theory and Practice. Cambridge: Cambridge University Press. ISBN 0-521-29629-3.
- White, Edmund. 1993. Genet. Corrected edition. London: Picador, 1994. ISBN 0-330-30622-7.
- Willett, John. 1978. The Theatre of Erwin Piscator: Half a Century of Politics in the Theatre. London: Methuen. ISBN 0-413-37810-1.
- Wright, Barbara and Terry Hands, trans. 1991. The Balcony By Jean Genet. London and Boston: Faber. ISBN 0-571-15246-5.
