= Stewart Laing =

Scottish theatre director and designer

Stewart Laing is a Scottish theatre director and a set designer. He was born in Blairgowrie and raised in East Kilbride. He founded the company Untitled Projects to create one-off genre-defying events.

His first production design after graduating from the Central School of Art and Design was for In the Bar of a Tokyo Hotel by Tennessee Williams for Internationalist Theatre at London`s New End Theatre in 1983.

Laing designed the set and costumes for the musical "Titanic". His set design for the musical was described as "technically astonishing", and won a Tony Award in 1997

He was a member of the creative team for the National Theatre of Scotland's first production Home, which premiered on 26 February 2006.

Paul Bright's Confessions of a Justified Sinner was produced by Laing's Untitled Projects at the Tramway, Glasgow, in 2013.
