= The Camp (1967 play) =

Play by Griselda Gambaro

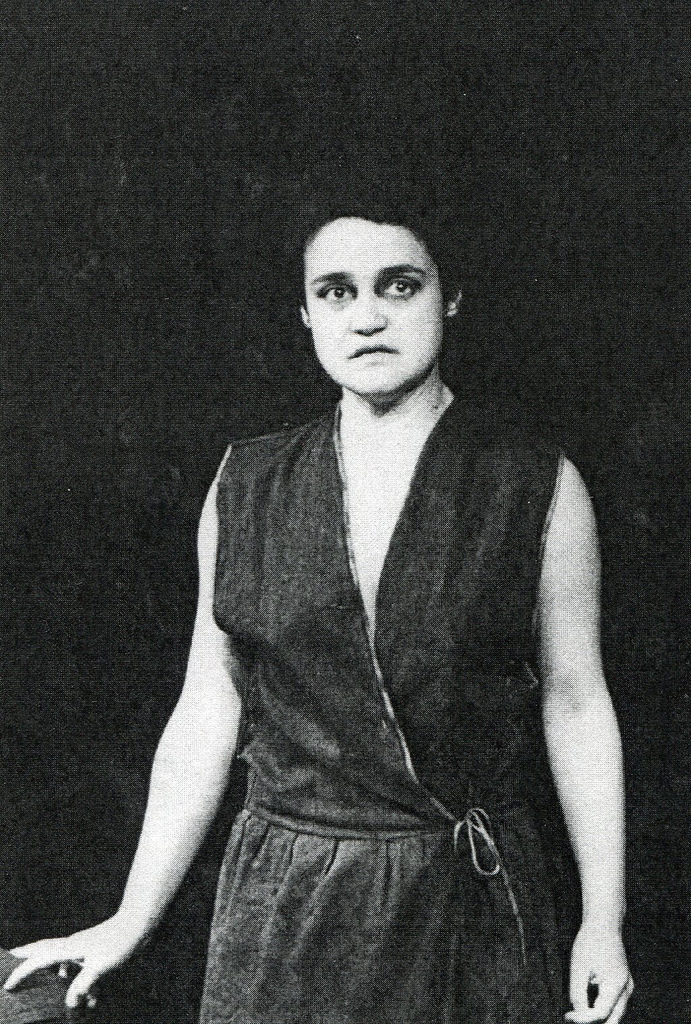
Angelique Rockas as Emma In The Camp by Internationalist Theatre London 1981

The Camp is a Latin American play written by Argentinian playwright and prize-winning novelist, Griselda Gambaro. Originally titled El Campo, the play opened in Buenos Aires in 1967 and since then has been translated into Portuguese, English, French, and Italian. It takes place in a modern Argentine Neo-Nazi concentration camp and reflects upon a time when, although World War II had ended, Argentina was still very invested in fascist and militaristic ideals. Often misinterpreted as belonging to the Theatre of the Absurd, The Camp is actually a part of el grotesco criollo, an Argentine theatre genre closely related to black comedy.

== Characters ==
- Martin (Originally Martín): Young and attractive protagonist. The new accountant of the corporation.
- Frank (Originally Franco): Martin's boss and the man who hires him. Emma's only friend and the force that sets up Emma and Martin.
- Emma: Martin's romantic interest and Frank's only friend. Plays the piano and scratches herself.
- The Piano Tuner: The piano tuner that is hired to tune the piano prior to Emma's performance.
- A Group of Gestapo Officers: The Gestapo officers that control both the prisoners and Martin at Emma's concert.
- A Group of Prisoners: The prisoners which make up the audience at Emma's concert.
- An Official: Official that bursts into Martin's home at the end of the play and brands him.
- Three Male Nurses: Male nurses and burly men who work for the Official and take part in Martin's branding and vaccination.

== Plot ==
=== Act One ===
==== Scene One ====
Young and attractive Martin shows up at an unidentified corporation and is told by a servant that Frank will soon be joining him to discuss his new occupation. Frank then appears in a Gestapo uniform and states that the only reason he is wearing it is because he enjoys it and he is not harming anyone. However, it is later revealed that he is being told to and that this is indeed a corporation led by many people. Frank and Martin discuss the political and social climate of the world while voices of children are heard below the window of the room. The papers that Frank gives Martin to sort through are actually piles of children's homework assignments. Frank also hears the peasants singing below the window throughout the scene and says that they always are marching when they sing that song. However, every time Frank mentions that people are below the window, Martin does not see anyone. Martin begins to get very confused as to where he is.

==== Scene Two ====
Martin has been at the corporation or camp for a while now, and he insists that he go take a walk. Frank does not allow Martin to leave for he wishes him to meet his only friend in the world, Emma. Emma acts as though she is a diva however she appears as if she just escaped from a concentration camp. She wears a prison smock of rough gray cloth, her head is completely shaved, she scratches herself all over her body, but she states that she is not itchy at all and she believes that she is indeed wearing a ball gown. Martin realizes that she has a number tattooed on her arm and is certain that she escaped from a camp, and asks her certain things about her past, but Emma refuses to answer his questions. Emma tries to seduce Martin on several occasions and becomes confused when Martin does not give in, as Emma has been told that he is an admirer. Martin says that he wants to leave but Emma insists that he stay to attend her upcoming piano concert. Frank takes out a whip and whips the floor, provoking Emma and triggering upset emotions. Frank has a misogynistic hold over Emma and her emotions. Martin is perplexed by this establishment.

==== Scene Three ====
The night of Emma's concert. Emma's piano tuner takes a long time tuning the piano and Frank gets frustrated–this leaves the piano broken and the piano does not make any sound when Emma begins to play. The concert is run by Gestapo officers and the audience is filled with prisoners dressed as though they are in a concentration camp. Frank mentions that he takes very good care of Emma and that she is up to date with all of her vaccinations. Martin shouts out a few times during the concert and is physically punished by the Gestapo officers. They scratch his face until it bleeds and force him back onto the bench when he stands up. As Emma's stagefright rises, Frank gets more frustrated and tells her that the show must go on. The piano does not make noise but Emma sings the notes of the piano and the crowd goes wild. She throws flowers at the audience and the concert ends. Once again, Frank pressures Emma and Martin into being intimate with one another and warns Martin that, should he disobey, he will lose his job. Frank also makes a remark that there is an odor in the air which means the children are burning the dead dogs again. Frank and Emma then tell Martin that they indeed were playing a prank on him and that Emma chooses to shave her head, does not have an itch, and enjoyed the joke very much. The act ends on Frank pressuring Martin into saying he also had fun and Emma falling to the floor in a fit of uncontrollable scratching.

=== Act Two ===
==== Scene One ====
Emma and Martin are performing duties and, although it is not revealed exactly why they are doing these tasks, Emma does say that "they left us here to work." Martin is writing on a tablet and Emma is embroidering on a large frame. Martin triggers Emma's memory of the "showers" and she quickly reverts to another topic: hunting. She mentions that Frank is out hunting foxes and that he should be back soon. Despite how many times Martin has introduced himself to her, Emma still cannot remember his name. Frank sends Emma outside to grab whatever she'd like from the dead foxes. Frank confesses to Martin that Emma has always been able to leave and that he cannot handle her behavior any longer. He begs Martin to take Emma away from him and, after being paid for his work, Martin quits his job and leaves with Emma.

==== Scene Two ====
Emma and Martin enter his family home and Martin realizes that something has changed. Neither his younger brothers nor parents are home and the entire place does not feel familiar to him. Screams of pain and noises of children playing are heard from outside the house, but Martin and Emma choose to ignore it. Martin is perplexed why his family is not home but just figures they went outside to play. Emma says she cannot stay in the house and demands to be placed in a hotel. She also looks through her suitcase and pulls out the only outfit her supposed secretary packed for her: a "red ball gown" (a prison smock just like the one she is wearing). Just then, an Official walks in and rubs his palms together with a sense of satisfaction, commenting that the door was open. Martin asks him to leave but the official demands that Martin be immunized. Three burly male nurses enter the house with a metal bed and branding instruments. Emma runs to the corner and while sobbing tells Martin that "in order to know who we are, a little mark…" but is cut off as the three male nurses sedate Martin with an injection. The Official then comes over with a hot branding iron as the lights go out on Emma's groans.

== Productions ==
- The play originally opened in 1967 in Buenos Aires, Argentina.
- In 1975, the Instituto Torcuato Di Tella, an avant-garde theatrical organization in Buenos Aires, produced The Camp and brought about Gambaro's international success. It was officially translated into English by William Oliver in 1971.
- In 1981 the play was premiered in London by Internationalist Theatre at Africa Centre, London and York and Albany with Angelique Rockas playing Emma "magistralmente".
- In 1983, the play opened in New York at the Open Space. It was directed by Francoise Kourilsky.
- The Camp was then produced again in Buenos Aires in 1984.

== Historical Context ==
Gambaro's work calls upon the Nazi regime and European ideals of fascism. This is because Argentine militaries were trained by German armies in the early 20th century and long after fascist ideals left Europe they found a home in certain quarters of Argentina. Long after World War II, fascist ideals and concentration camps were still very much a part of life for those living in Argentina. The Camp mostly revolves around the political violence and the effects of torture on innocent people who allow themselves to be victims of political torture.

The Camp was written just after a massive military coup in 1966 and refers to the dictatorships that ruled Argentina. Gambaro's plays, including The Camp, discuss the violent and brutal political regime of Isabel Péron which eventually led to the Dirty War led by General Jorge Rafael Videla–a time when 30,000 Argentinians were murdered by the government.

Additionally, the character of Frank's name was originally Franco in Gambaro's text and is reminiscent of late Spanish dictator Francisco Franco.

== See also ==
- Dirty War
- Torcuato di Tella Institute
- Griselda Gambaro
- Isabel Perón
- Jorge Rafael Videla
- Theatre of the absurd
