= Garry Cooper =

English actor

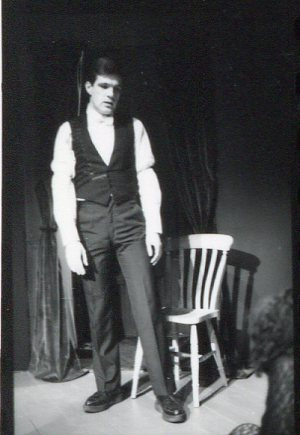
Garry Cooper as Jean in Miss Julie Internationalist Theatre, 1984

Garry Cooper (born 2 June 1955) is an English actor.

He was born in Hull, East Yorkshire, on 2 June 1955. Garry trained at Drama Centre, London and has worked extensively in film, television and theatre. On stage, he made his mark as Jean in the Internationalist Theatre production of Miss Julie

== Filmography ==
Title	Year	Role	Notes
Play for Today	1979	Billy / Young Chas	2 episodes
My Son, My Son	1979	Man In Boiler Suit	1 episode
Quadrophenia	1979	Peter	
Secret Orchard	1979	Waiter on Train	TV movie
ITV Playhouse	1980	Red	Episode: "Looking for Vicky"
Mackenzie	1980	Ricky	Episode: "Sole Agent"
Metal Mickey	1981	Lance	2 episodes
BBC2 Playhouse	1981	Orderly	Episode: "Going Gently"
Jackanory Playhouse	1982	Peter	Episode: "The Blacksmith's Son"
Bognor	1982	Harold Bazeley	Episode: "Just Desserts: Part 2 - A Health Warning"
The Brack Report	1982	Motorcyclist	Episode: "Chapter 8"
Walter	1982	Roger - Stockroom	TV movie
P'tang, Yang, Kipperbang	1982	Tommy	TV movie
Jemima Shore Investigates	1983	Barry Hatchett	Episode: "High Style"
Nineteen Eighty-Four	1984	Guard #1	
Summer Season	1985	Second guard	Episode: "A Crack in the Ice"
My Beautiful Laundrette	1985	Squatter	
Full House	1985	Mate	Episode: "May the Best Man Win"
Prospects	1986	Pete	Episode: "Partners in Brine"
Caravaggio	1986	Davide	
Dramarama	1986	Father	Episode: "A Couple of Charlies"
Dempsey and Makepeace	1986	Swabey	Episode: "Out of Darkness"
Prick Up Your Ears	1987	Actor 1 - Mr Sloane	
The Bill	1988-2003	Neil Chambers / Frank Wilmot / Sgt. Kegan / Sgt. Kegan / Gary Andrews / Dave West	8 episodes
Hannay	1989	Joe Morris	Episode: "That Rough Music"
Coronation Street	1989-1991	Detective Sergeant Richardson	4 episodes
Mountains Of The Moon	1990	Stoyan	
Trainer	1991	Harry Smethurst	Episode: "Fight Night"
London Kills Me	1991	Mr. G	
Boon	1991	Dave Woolfe	Episode: "The Night Before Christmas"
Soldier Soldier	1991-1996	Sgt Griffiths, RMP	4 episodes
Between the Lines	1992	D.S. Mercer	
Rumpole Of The Bailey	1992	Michael Mathieson	
Perfect Scoundrels	1992	Marty Hampton	
An Ungentlemanly Act	1992	Colour Sgt. Muir	
Spender	1993	Terry Armstrong	Episode: "Kid"
Darling Buds Of May	1993	George	
Harry	1993	Jo Jo	1 episode
Casualty	1993-1995	Phil / Han Dybendak	2 episodes
Men Of The World	1994	Mr. Royston	Episode: "The Assessment"
Lovejoy	1994	Kevin The Ponce	Episode: "Guns and Roses"
Jacob	1994	Canaanite	TV movie
Heartbeat	1994-2006	Arthur Jacobs / Len Brown	2 episodes
Peak Practice	1995	Alan Davies	Episode: "A Normal Life"
Emmerdale	1995	Derek Simpson	10 episodes
The Ruth Rendell Mysteries	1996	Sergeant Holt	Episode: "A Case of Coincidence": Part 1, 2
The Writing On The Wall	1996	Fred	TV movie
Beautiful Thing	1996	Ronnie Pearce	
Breakout	1997	Andy Cresswell	TV movie
Dalziel and Pascoe	1997	Frostrick	Episode: "Exit Lines"
Screen One	1997	Gennady	Episode: "Hostile Waters"
Bugs	1997	Johns	Episode: "Buried Treasure"
The Fix	1997	Skipper	TV movie
The Emissary: A Biblical Epic	1997	Saul / Paul	
Dangerfield	1998	James Southel	Episode: "The Long Weekend"
The Children Of The New Forest	1998	Oswald Partridge	TV movie
Where the Heart Is	1999	Tom Lewis	Episode: "Not My Brother"
The Vice	1999-2000	Supt. Jeffrey Callard	6 episodes
Holby City	1999-2004	George Keating / David Coombes	11 episodes
At Home with the Braithwaites	2000-2002	Colin Skidmore	8 episodes
In a Land of Plenty	2001	Stanley	6 episodes
Ella and the Mothers	2002	DI Robertson	TV movie
Barbara	2003	Cynthia	Episode: "Queenie"
Murder in Mind	2003	DI Frank Slater	Episode: "Landlord"
Charles II: The Power and the Passion	2003	General Monck	1 episode
Midsomer Murders	2004	James Griss	Episode: "Things That Go Bump in the Night"
Hiroshima	2005	Groves	TV movie documentary
Doctors	2005	Nigel Baines	Episode: "Herbaceous Borders"
Taggart	2006	Noah Buckland	Episode: "Law"
The Harvest	2006	Paul Stoichita	Short
Criminal Justice	2008	Ruddock	3 episodes
Minder	2009	Jacko	Episode: "Till Debt Do Us Part"
Universal Soldier: Regeneration	2009	Dr. Porter	
Broadside	2009	Tromp	TV movie
Dead Man Running	2009	Faceless Man	
Bibliothèque Pascal	2010	The Professor	
Zen	2011	Angelo	3 episodes
House of the Dragon	2022	Ryam Redwyne	Episode: "The Heirs of the Dragon"
Better	2023	Peter 'Bulgey' Donovan	Police drama
