= George Eugeniou =

Cypriot actor, director and writer (1931–2024)

George Eugeniou (10 June 1931 – 14 December 2024) was a Cypriot actor, director and writer. He was the founder and artistic director of Theatro Technis now known as Art_Theatre in London, England, which was established in 1957.

== Early life and career ==
George Eugeniou was born in Limassol, Cyprus on 10 June 1931. He came to London in 1950 to study theatre with the support of his eldest sister, Loula Ionnides, and her family.

He trained at Morley College, where he met Frank Drew, who gave him free lessons in diction and voice. With Drew's help, Eugeniou received a scholarship at the Webber Douglas Academy of Dramatic Art, where he won Spotlight and Webber Cup awards for his acting abilities.

=== Theatre ===
In 1954 he joined Dundee Repertory Theatre company in Scotland as assistant stage manager, while also performing small parts. Then, he returned to London and joined a Cypriot amateur group under the auspices of The Cypriot Brotherhood with Paul Stasino, Anna Koutayiar and Theo Moreas. One year later he joined Sir Donald Wolfit's company which was performing the play The Strong are Lonely, touring all the major cities of England ending at Piccadilly Theatre first and then at the Haymarket Theatre. In 1956, he joined Joan Littlewood's Theatre Workshop in Stratford East with several productions, including The Quare Fellow by Brendan Behan.

=== Film and Television work ===
Virgin of the Secret Service (TV Series): The Great Ring of Akba, Theatre 625 a BBC anthology TV series: Amerika, Love Story (1973 TV series): A Toy Soldier and Chase the Shadows, That Riviera Touch film, Drama 61-67 (TV Series): The Trouble with England, Danger Man (TV Series): Yesterday's Enemies, The Plane Makers (TV Series): A Bunch of Fives, Ghost Squad (TV Series): Quarantine at Kavar and The Magic Bullet, Man of the World: Jungle Mission and The Sentimental Agent, The Interrogator, The Kitchen based on Arnold Wesker's play, Danger Man (TV Series): Bury the Dead, BBC Sunday-Night Play (TV Series): Pay Day, Scotland Yard (TV series): Interpol, Dial 999 TV, Act of Terror TV, The Third Man (TV series), Three Dancing Turtles, Julius Caesar TV, BBC Saturday-Night Theatre (TV Series): The Picnic at Sakkara, The Strong Are Lonely, The Angry Hills, I Was Monty's Double, The Truth About Melandrinos (TV Series), The Power and the Glory (TV Movie), Indian man, Santa Claus in a Jeep, Kill Me Tomorrow film, Ill Met by Moonlight, Dixon of Dock Green (TV Series).

=== Author ===
- Adaptation of Aristophanes The Knights named Oh Democracy!
- Cassandra `s Choice (poems)
- Cyprus Trilogy -3 plays by George Eugeniou
- 'The Goon Trilogy': "Burnt Cakes", "Good Guys", "Forza Galileo" (Hardback)

== Theatro Technis ==
In 1957, Eugeniou founded Theatro Technis, which was neither commercial nor subsidised, with the help of a group of actors, workers and students, including Andreas Markou, Stelios Kyriacou, Medea O'Brennon, Andy Lysandrou and Spyros Kyprianou. Theatro Technis can be defined as a "radical and total" theatre as Eugeniou's philosophy is to break barriers between nationalities, religions, genders, sexual orientations, classes, ages and languages. Eugeniou has totally dedicated himself to Theatro Technis, abandoning his career as a mainstream actor, apart from a few movies in the 1950s and '60s.

As Theatro Technis' artistic director he devised, directed and acted in numerous productions, often inspired by Cypriot or Greek artists and events. At Theatro Technis Eugeniou has staged: Ancient Greek Drama plays that explore problems that confront the Cypriot community in the UK, promoted new writing by Cypriot Greek writers like Stavros Lilitos sponsored the staging of international plays by visiting companies like Griselda Gambaro`s `The Chinese Twins`, and Japan`s Mugensha Theatre Company and championing Justin Butcher's The Madness of George Dubya, reviewed by The Guardian's Michael Billington "Satire is all but dead on the London stage, so this show by Justin Butcher deserves the warmest of welcomes. Even if it is largely a topical update of Kubrick's Dr Strangelove, it had a packed house at this north London fringe theatre cheering it to the echo." The successful run of “The Madness of George Dubya” at Theatro Technis led to its transfer to the Pleasance Theatre in Islington and also garnered support from celebrities such as Dustin Hoffman.

Eugeniou was among the first to produce plays written or acted by black personalities such as Mark Heath, Harcourt Nichols, and Peter Blackman. Eugeniou has helped hundreds of student from all over London and abroad, proposing work-experiences or internships, free of charge. His passion for alternative theatre remains a common thread in his work as he always believed that the creative spirit is not for sale.

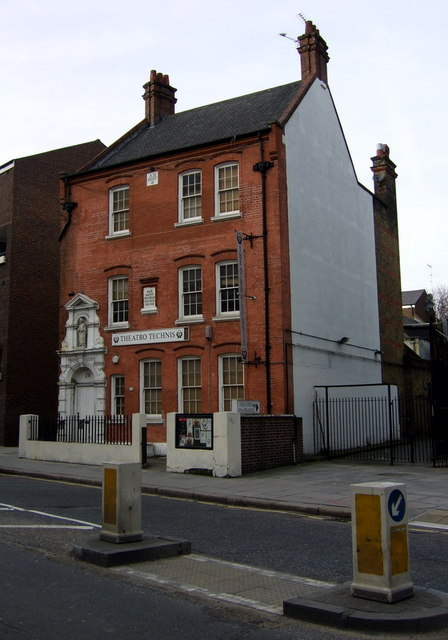
Theatro Technis, Crowndale Road - geograph.org.uk - 675198

Still marked by his Cypriot accent, Eugeniou staged a production of Aristophanes' famous satires, as Women in Parliament, in June 2013.

== Help to the Cypriot community ==
In 1967, he initiated the Cyprus Week, an annual festival to highlight the Cypriot culture and way of life in the United Kingdom and to create a greater awareness of the struggle of Cyprus against British colonialism and Turkish invasion of Cyprus. He was also one of the founders of the National Federation of Cypriots in England, an umbrella organisation of more than one hundred Cypriot organisations.

In 1968, he created the first Cypriot Advisory Service in the United Kingdom, which has helped thousands of Cypriot migrants and refugees receive welfare benefits, education, or housing. He also instigated and helped build the Cyprus Villages Housing in partnership with St Pancras Housing Association in the late 1980s. This "from life to art to life" philosophy is a cornerstone of his work.

== Personal life and death ==
In 1969, Eugeniou married Maroulla Sekkides, who became an actress with Theatro Technis. They had a son Aris, who is also dedicated to the theatre.

George Eugeniou died on 14 December 2024, at the age of 93. He was described as a visionary and ` leaves behind an indelible legacy. In 2022 the 120-seat venue offered a home to the displaced Gate Theatre and has continued to be a space for creative expression and cultural dialogue, staging plays by Sanaz Toossi and Sami Ibrahim`
