= Antigona Furiosa =

Gambaro play

Antígona Furiosa, written in the period of 1985-86 by Griselda Gambaro, is an Argentinian drama heavily influenced by Antigone by Sophocles, and comments on an era of government terrorism that later transformed into the Dirty War of Argentina.Antígona Furiosa was first published 1989 in Griselda Gambaro: Teatro 3 in Buenos Aires, after it stayed many years hidden while Gambaro was in exile in Barcelona. The play premiered September 24, 1986 at the Goethe Institute in Buenos Aires under the direction of Laura Yusem.

== Background ==
Gambaro's writing has been influenced by the politics of Argentina, which has seen three military takeovers, two rigged elections, several factions of urban guerrillas, and the state-run Dirty War from 1976-83. Gambaro was forced into exile in 1977 as a result of her novel, Ganarse la muerte, which was banned by president General Jorge Rafael Videla. During exile she resided in Barcelona until 1980. Gambaro refused to have Antígona Furiosa produced for many years, fearing repercussions against family members still in Argentina.

== Plot ==
The play begins with Antígona hanged in a white dress and a withered flower crown. She removes the rope around her neck and starts to sing the same song Ophelia sings in Shakespeare's Hamlet, after her character is driven insane by her lover. Two men, Coryphaeus and Antinous, are drinking coffee and mocking Antígona’s song. These two men will continue to follow her in her story, sometimes appearing as different characters in Antígona's life. Antígona asks about the dark drink at their table; when Coryphaeus tells her it’s coffee Antígona states the drink is dark as poison. Coryphaeus bursts into laughter, then pretends with great exaggeration that he is dying from its "poison," with Antinous quickly joining in. Antígona doesn’t seem to be fazed by their jokes, and as though she is dissociated from what she is doing, she grabs the crown on Coryphaeus’ head and smashes it, which causes yet another bout of laughter from the two men. The mocking they will continue to do alludes to the story of Antigone by Sophocles and how Polynices (Antigone/a's brother) was stripped of his title by King Creon, and refused proper burial whilst his other brother, Etecoles, was buried with honor. While the two finish laughing, Antígona begins to walk around the "bodies" of the un-buried, until she finds her brother, Polynices. She throws herself on top of him, protecting or attempting to revive him, and attempts to give him proper burial. Antinous remarks how she wasn't able to bury him, as the earth was too hard, and that is how the guards caught her. King Creon, through the character of Coryphaeus, approaches her and demands why she dare defy him, but she stands with her actions, and proceeds to mock her sister Ismene's cowardliness in refusing to bury her brother with her. King Creon then confronts his son and Antígona's former fiancée Haemon (who is embodied for a moment in Antígona,) and tells him he will not sway his decision to execute his bride-to-be. Haemon agrees he will not try to sway his decision, but responds Creon has condemned her unjustly, and refuses to spit in Antígona's face when he demands it.

The events fall one right after the other, and the dialogue begins to discuss the day Antigone is to be sentenced to death. Haemon refuses to watch her die, and Ismene is given pardon. Antígona, however, is sent to a cave with only one day's supply of food. Coryphaeus and Antinous, only onlookers and commentators of this story, grow weary of the sadness of Antígona's slow death and wish to go home, only to realize that the plague of Polynice's death is falling upon them, and they cannot escape the filth. Antígona hangs herself in the cave, and the three then describe how Haemon attempts to kill King Creon, but kills himself instead, and how Creon's wife, Eurydice, stabbed herself to death. King Creon, alone in his grief, realizes his mistake and pardons Antígona. Though pardoned, Antígona claims she will always want to bury Polynices, to which Coryphaeus and Antinous reply that she will always be punished. Antígona asks if there will ever be an end to this mockery; then, with fury, she kills herself.

== Characters ==
- Antígona: embodies Antigone, but also transforms into Haemon for a momentary confrontation.
- Coryphaeus: Chorus, friend of Antinuous, man at the coffee shop, embodies the King Creon throughout the play. (King Creon is signified through a movable pectoral worn like a garment by the chorus, manipulated like a puppet.)
- Antinous: Chorus, friend of Coryphaeus, man at the coffee shop.

== Original cast and creative team ==
The play premiered on September 24, 1986, at the Goethe Institute in Buenos Aires with the following cast and artistic crew:

| Role | Cast |
|---|---|
| Antígona | Bettina Muraña |
| Coryphaeus | Noberto Vieyra |
| Antinous | Ivan Moschner |

| Artistic Title | Crew |
|---|---|
| Set Design | Graciela Galán, Juan Carlos Distéfano |
| Costumes | Graciela Galán |
| Creon's Shell | Juan Carlos Distéfano |
| Assistant Director | Jerry Brignone |
| Director, MISE-EN-SCENE | Laura Yusem |
