= Renu Setna =

Pakistani-born British actor (born 1929)

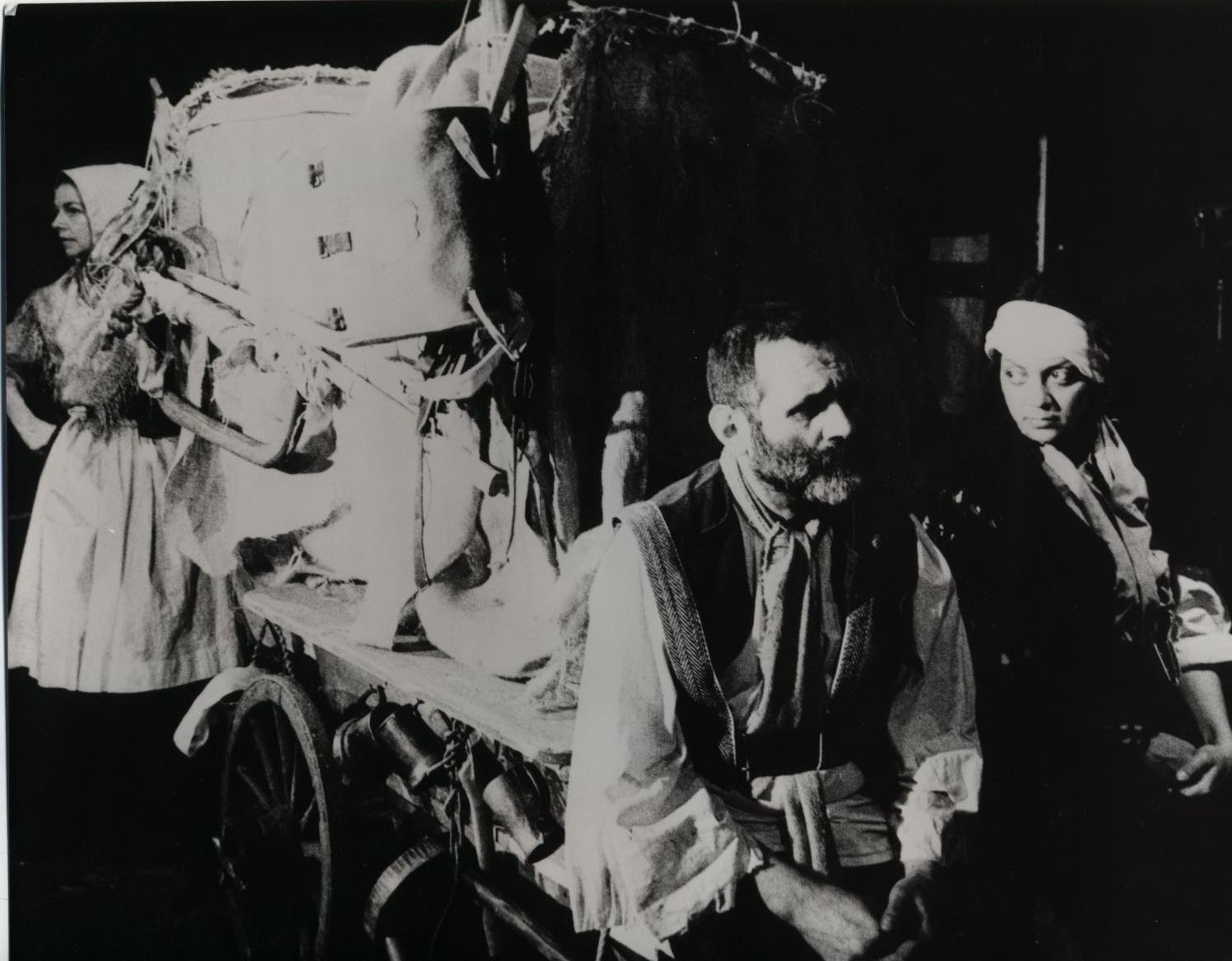
- Mother Courage (1982) with Renyu Setna as the Chaplin
- Born: 1929 (age 97); Karachi, British India
- Occupation: Actor

Renu Setna (born 1929) is a Pakistani-born British actor. His roles on television include the shopkeeper Mr. Kittel in In Sickness and in Health. and Mr. Ram in the Only Fools and Horses episode Cash and Curry.

== Career ==
Setna began his acting career after winning a scholarship to RADA in 1960. He has played roles in productions from Delhi, Pune, Mumbai, Calcutta, Hyderabad and Bangalore. Before this he was employed building houses as a manual labourer in the 1950s.

Setna has appeared in some of Britain's most successful television series: Z-Cars, Doomwatch, I, Claudius, Cloud Burst, It Ain't Half Hot Mum, Only Fools and Horses, Doctor Who, Crossroads, The Bill, Open All Hours, Are You Being Served?, Some Mothers Do 'Ave 'Em, In Sickness and in Health, Minder, Holby City, Silent Witness and Collision. Renu Setna's stage work includes Khahil Gibran at the Commonwealth Theatre in London, Shakespeare roles , Gandhi directed by Peter Stevenson with John Castle in the title role at the Tricycle Theatre, and the role of the Chaplain in Mother Courage and Her Children by Bertolt Brecht also directed by Peter Stevenson for Internationalist Theatre for which he gained good notices in The Stage.

On 19 May 2003, Setna was quoted in BBC News alongside Albert Moses saying that British programmes should be hiring British Asian actors rather than actors from India.

== Roles ==
Setna is known for playing Asian characters in British television and films.
