= Anna Savva =

Actress

- Born: United Kingdom
- Occupations: Television actress; Stage actress
- Years active: 1985-present
- Agent: James Foster at James Foster Ltd.
- Notable work: The Durrells

Anna Savva is an actress who has appeared in many British TV shows since 1985.

Anna plays series regular, Lugaretzia, across all four series of Simon Nye's The Durrells in 2016.

Savva's early stage work included performances at Theatro Technis in London during the late 1970s and early 1980. She played Calonice in Lysistrata (starting 1 December 1977), Maria in A Dowry with 2 White Doves (January 1978), Demosthenia in Oh Democracy (21 February – 23 March 1978), Kyria in Don Kamillo (2–16 March 1979), and Yiota in Aphrodite Unbound (15 March – April 1980).

She originated the role of Martha in the world-premiere of Howard Brenton's JUDE at The Hampstead Theatre.

She has had roles in Minder, EastEnders, Prime Suspect and Planespotting. In 2026, she played Hortense LeRoux in Series 15, Episode 7 of Death in Paradise.

She also helped puppeteer "Audrey II" in Little Shop of Horrors.
