= Enemies (play) =

Play by Maxim Gorky

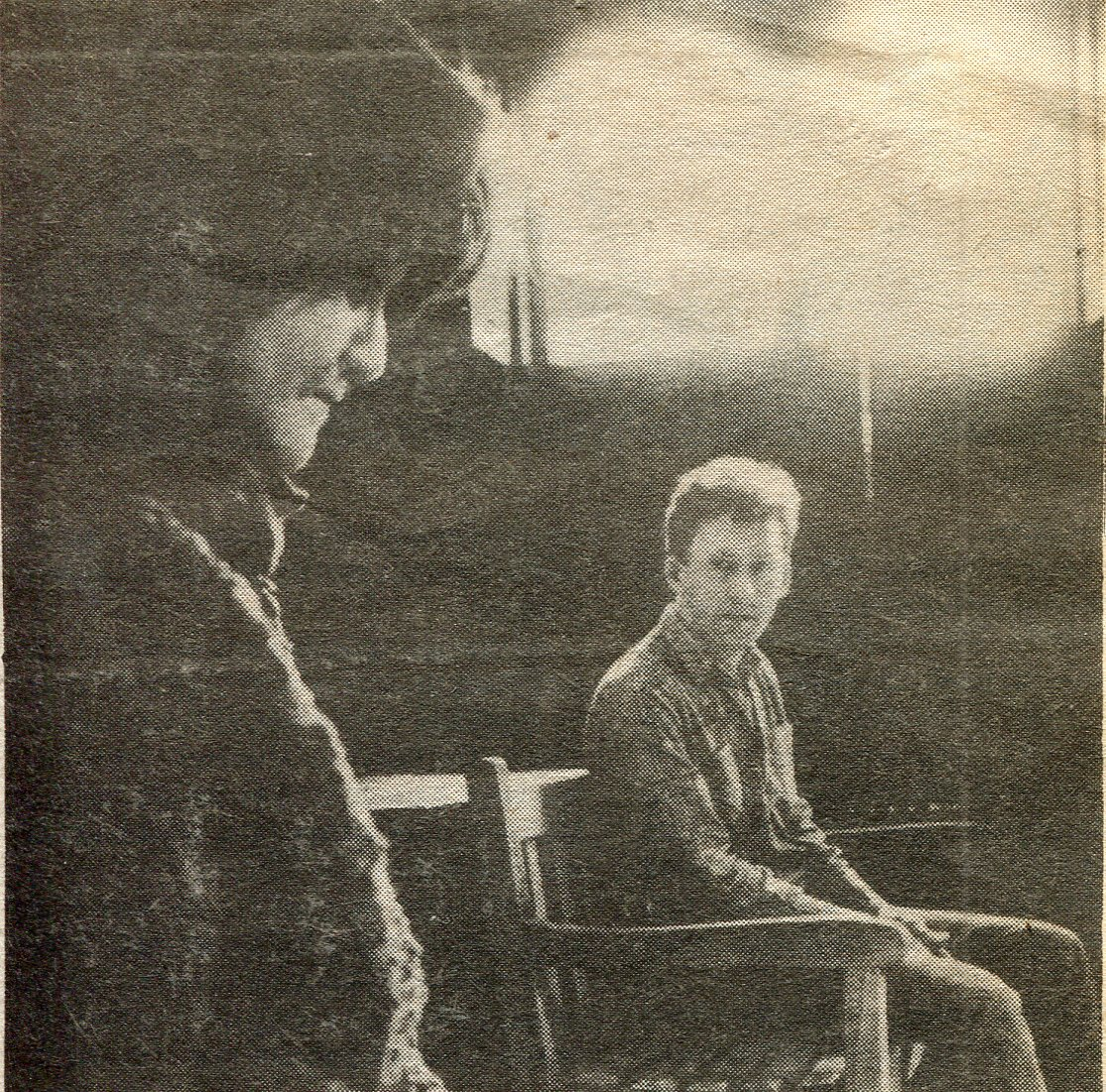
Angelique Rockas as Tatiana in Gorky's Enemies

Enemies (Russian: Враги, romanized: Vragi) is a 1906 Russian-language play by Maxim Gorky. It was published in 1906 in the collection Znaniye (Knowledge, book 14), in Saint Petersburg, at a time when Gorky was actively involved with the Russian revolutionary underground, which served as the impetus for the play. It is a recognized as an early work of socialist realism.

== Plot ==
The action takes place in 1905 at the factory of the landowners Bardiny and Skrobotov. Skrobotov is dissatisfied with the liberal policy of his partner Bardiny and complains that the workers are given too much voice – "They don't dare squeak at me!" says Skrobotov, sincerely believing that the working class should not be allowed entertainment, education, or voting rights.

The factory has a social democratic worker's organization, and its activists demand the removal of a cruel manager, Dichkov. Skrobotov categorically refuses, believing that even if Dichkov deserves removal in this case, doing so in response to worker demands would be a fatal step.

Discussions between the workers lead nowhere, the situation spirals out of control, Skrobotov summons the militia, and blood is shed. One of the enraged workers mortally wounds Skrobotov, who before he dies identifies the worker as a communist. A murder investigation ensues, the militia arresting masses of workers. But the workers do not break, and display iron calm, coolness and courage.

A worker, Akimov, comes to Bardiny and confesses to the murder. But other workers come, and stand behind Akimov. Skrobotov's widow Cleopatra advises Akimov to flee into exile, to which Akimov responds:

We will not be thrown out, no! We will do the throwing! We have lived in the dark of lawlessness long enough! Now we ourselves are aflame with light – a light you cannot put out. No fear can extinguish us now.

== Productions and adaptations ==
Enemies was produced at the Moscow Art Theater beginning October 10, 1935, directed by Vladimir Nemirovich-Danchenko and Mikhail Nikolayevich Kedrov. The British premiere took place in 1947 at the Unity Theatre in London: a message in the programme from the Soviet ambassador stated that the production would help relations between the Soviet Union and Britain.

Ann Pennington directed a multi-national production of 'Enemies' in association with Internationalist Theatre, in London, in the March of 1985. One critic saw a parallel between the workers' uprising in Enemies and the Miners' Strike that had been running in the UK since 1984, saying, " it is about the miners strike " UK miners' strike (1984–85). Gorky`s "pseudo-populism" is done away with in this production by the actors speaking "without distinctive accents and consequently without populist sentiment". Designed by Paul Brown, the cast included Madlena Nedeva, Nick Ellsworth, Angelique Rockas and Marilyn Flynn.

A production was mounted at the Omsk Academic Drama Theater, beginning May 20, 2014, directed by Georgy Zurabovich Tskhvirava.

Enemies was adapted into an English-language television film, broadcast under the auspices of Great Performances on January 23, 1974. Ellis Rabb wrote the adaptation and shared directing credit with Kirk Browning, and also appeared as an actor, as did Frances Sternhagen, Peter Donat, Kate Reid, and Josef Sommer.
