= Miss Julie =

1888 play by August Strindberg

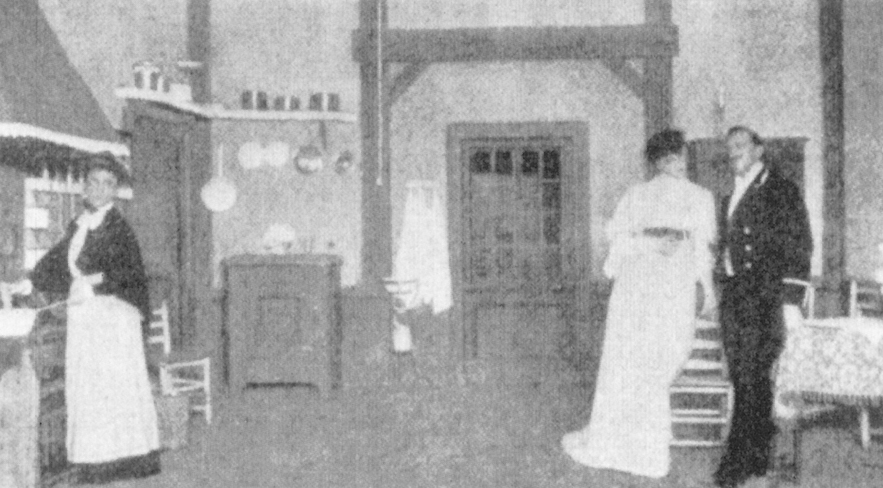
- First Miss Julie production, November 1906, The People's Theatre, Stockholm. Sacha Sjöström (left) as Kristin, Manda Björling as Miss Julie and August Falck as Jean
- Original language: Swedish
- Written by: August Strindberg
- Characters: Miss Julie, Jean, Christine
- Genre: Naturalism

Premiere
- Date: 14 March 1889

Miss Julie (Swedish: Fröken Julie) is a naturalistic play written in 1888 by August Strindberg. It is set on Midsummer's Eve and the following morning, which is Midsummer and the Feast Day of St. John the Baptist. The setting is an estate of a count in Sweden. Miss Julie is drawn to a senior servant, a valet named Jean, who is well-traveled and well-read. The action takes place in the kitchen of Miss Julie's father's manor, where Jean's fiancée, a servant named Christine, cooks and sometimes sleeps while Jean and Miss Julie talk.

== Themes ==
One theme of the play is Darwinism, a theory that was a significant influence on the author during his naturalistic period. This theme is stated explicitly in the preface, where Strindberg describes his two lead characters, Miss Julie and Jean, as vying against each other in an evolutionary "life and death" battle for a survival of the fittest. The character of Miss Julie represents the last of a dying aristocratic breed and serves to characterize women in modernity. Jean represents one who is clambering upwards and who is fitter to thrive because he is more adaptable in terms of the "life roles" he can take on.

The play has various themes, partly because Miss Julie's actions are motivated by a range of factors and influences: her class, her desires and impulsive nature, her father, and the dynamic traumas of her family histories. In utilizing the naturalistic style, the author goes against the dominant theatrical idea that says that characters should be written with only one primary motivation.

== The author's preface ==
Miss Julie is preceded by an author's preface, which is considered a significant manifesto of naturalism in the theatre. In it Strindberg states that the source of the play is an actual story he once heard, which made a strong impression on him, and which "seemed appropriate for tragedy, for it still seems tragic to see someone favored by fortune go under, much more to see a family die out."

Strindberg describes both Jean and Miss Julie as representations of their classes and society. The people in the play are described by Strindberg as "modern characters living in an age of transition [...] more vacillating and disintegrating than their predecessors, a mixture of the old and the new." The preface to the play may not be the best guide to the play, and is at times in variance with the play itself. The preface urges naturalism and deterministic readings of the play, but the play seems to offer more anti-naturalism and even feminist readings. Strindberg's play may have other values than his own critical assessment. In the preface, Strindberg discusses aristocracy and classism beyond what occurs in the play itself.

== Naturalism ==
Strindberg wrote this play with the intention of abiding by the theories of "naturalism"–both his own version, and also the version described by the French novelist and literary theoretician Émile Zola. Zola's term for naturalism is la nouvelle formule. The three primary principles of naturalism (faire vrai, faire grand and faire simple) are:

1. Faire vrai: The play should be realistic and the result of a careful study of human behavior and psychology. The characters should be flesh and blood; their motivations and actions should be grounded in their heredity and environment. The presentation of the play in terms of the setting and performances should be realistic and not flamboyant or theatrical. The single setting of Miss Julie, for example, is a kitchen.
2. Faire grand: The conflicts in the play should be issues of meaningful, life-altering significance–not small or petty.
3. Faire simple: The play should be simple–not cluttered with complicated sub-plots or lengthy expositions.

Strindberg believed that French playwrights had been unable to achieve naturalism in their writings, and he felt that he could. Miss Julie is not only successful as a naturalistic drama, but it is a play that has achieved the rare distinction of being performed on stages all over the world every year since it was written in 1888.

== Origins of the play ==
Strindberg's brother, Olof Strindberg, was head gardener at the manor house of Leufsta, also called Lovstabruk, a grand estate which had been largely created by the entomologist Charles De Geer in the eighteenth century. It may be that Olof's experiences influenced August's portrayal of life in a grand manor house. The play was written as Strindberg was creating a new theatre of his own, the Scandinavian Naturalistic Theater, which would be founded in Copenhagen. Miss Julie would be the premier offering. Strindberg's wife, Siri von Essen, would star in the title role, and she would also be the artistic director. After Strindberg agreed to a small amount of censorship, the play was published a few weeks before the first production. (The first English translations also contain these censored excisions. For example, the first audiences were spared the shock of hearing Miss Julie, in an angry moment, compare having sex with Jean to an act of bestiality.) With disastrous timing for new theater, the censors announced during the dress rehearsal that Miss Julie would be forbidden. However, Strindberg managed to get around the censors by having Miss Julie premiere a few days later at the Copenhagen University Student Union.

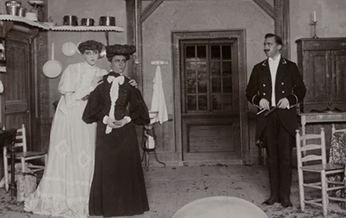
First Miss Julie production, November 1906, The People's Theatre, Stockholm. Manda Björling as Miss Julie (left), Sacha Sjöström as Kristin, and August Falck as Jean.

== Characters ==
Miss Julie: Strong-willed daughter of the Count who owns the estate. Raised by her late mother to "think like and act like a man," she is a confused individual: she is aware of the power she holds, but switches between being above the servants and flirting with Jean, her father's manservant. She longs to fall from her pillar, an expression symbolically put across as a recurring dream she has.

Jean: Manservant to the Count. He tells a story of seeing Miss Julie many times as a child and loving her even then, but the truth of the story is later denied (there is good evidence both for and against its veracity). Jean left the town and traveled widely, working many different jobs as he went, before finally returning to work for the count. He has aspirations to rise from his station in life and manage his own hotel, and Miss Julie is part of his plan. He is alternately kind and callous. Despite his aspirations, he is rendered servile by the mere sight of the count's gloves and boots.

Christine (or Kristine): The cook in the Count's household. She is devoutly religious and apparently betrothed to Jean, although they refer to this marriage almost jokingly.

The Count: Miss Julie's father. He is never seen, but his gloves and his boots are on stage, serving as a reminder of his power. When a bell sounds, his presence is also noted more strongly.

== Plot ==
Jean walks on the stage, the set being the kitchen of the manor. He drops the Count's boots off to the side but still within view of the audience; his clothing shows that he is a valet. Jean talks to Christine about Miss Julie's peculiar behavior. He considers her mad since she went to the barn dance, danced with the gamekeeper, and tried to waltz with Jean, a mere servant of the Count. Christine delves into Miss Julie's background, stating how, unable to face her family after the humiliation of breaking her engagement, she stayed behind to mingle with the servants at the dance instead of going with her father to the Midsummer's Eve celebrations. Miss Julie got rid of her fiancé seemingly because he refused her demand that he jump over a riding whip she was holding. The incident, apparently witnessed by Jean, was similar to training a dog to jump through a hoop.

Jean takes out a bottle of fine wine with a "yellow seal" and reveals, by the way he flirts with her, that he and Christine are engaged. Noticing a stench, Jean asks what Christine is cooking so late on Midsummer's Eve. The pungent mixture turns out to be an abortifacient for Miss Julie's dog, which was impregnated by the gatekeeper's mongrel. Jean calls Miss Julie "too stuck-up in some ways and not proud enough in others," traits apparently inherited from her mother. Despite Miss Julie's character flaws, Jean finds her beautiful or perhaps simply a stepping stone to achieve his lifelong goal of owning an inn. When Miss Julie enters and asks Christine if the "meal" has finished cooking, Jean instantly shapes up, becoming charming and polite. Jokingly, he asks if the women are gossiping about secrets or making a witch's broth for seeing Miss Julie's future suitor.

After more niceties, Miss Julie invites Jean once more to dance the waltz, at which point he hesitates, pointing out that he already promised Christine a dance and that the gossip generated by such an act would be savage. Almost offended by this response, Julie justifies her request by pulling rank: she is the lady of the house and must have the best dancer as her partner. Then, insisting that rank does not matter, she convinces Jean to waltz with her. When they return, Miss Julie recounts a dream of climbing up a pillar and being unable to get down. Jean responds with a story of creeping into her walled garden as a child―he saw it as "the Garden of Eden, guarded by angry angels with flaming swords"―and, from under a pile of stinking weeds, gazing at her longingly. He says he was so distraught with this unrequitable love that, after seeing her at a Sunday church service, he tried to die beautifully and pleasantly by sleeping in a bin of oats strewn with elderflowers, as sleeping under an elder tree was thought to be dangerous.

At this point Jean and Miss Julie notice some servants heading up to the house, singing a song that mocks the pair of them. They hide in Jean's room. Although Jean swears he won't take advantage of her there, when they emerge later it becomes clear that the two have had sex. Now they are forced to figure out how to deal with it, as Jean theorizes that they can no longer live in the same household because he feels they will be tempted to continue their relationship until they are caught. Now he confesses that he was only pretending when he said he had tried to commit suicide out of love of her. Furiously, Miss Julie tells him of how her mother raised her to be submissive to no man. They then decide to run away together to start a hotel, with Jean running it and Miss Julie providing the capital. Miss Julie agrees and steals some of her father's money, but angers Jean when she insists on bringing her little bird along saying that the bird is the only creature that loves her, after her dog Diana was "unfaithful" to her. When Miss Julie insists that she would rather kill the bird than see it in the hands of strangers, Jean cuts off its head.

In the midst of this confusion, Christine comes downstairs, ready to go to church. She is shocked by Jean and Miss Julie's planning and unmoved when Miss Julie asks her to come along with them as head of the kitchen of the hotel. Christine explains to Miss Julie about God and forgiveness and heads off for church, telling them as she leaves that she will tell the stablemasters not to let them take out any horses so that they cannot run off. Shortly after, they receive word that Miss Julie's father, the Count, has returned. At this, both lose courage and find themselves unable to go through with their plans. Miss Julie realizes that she has nothing to her name, as her thoughts and emotions were taught to her by her mother and her father. She asks Jean if he knows of any way out for her. He takes a shaving razor and hands it to her. The play ends as she walks through the door with the razor, presumably to commit suicide.

== Stage productions ==
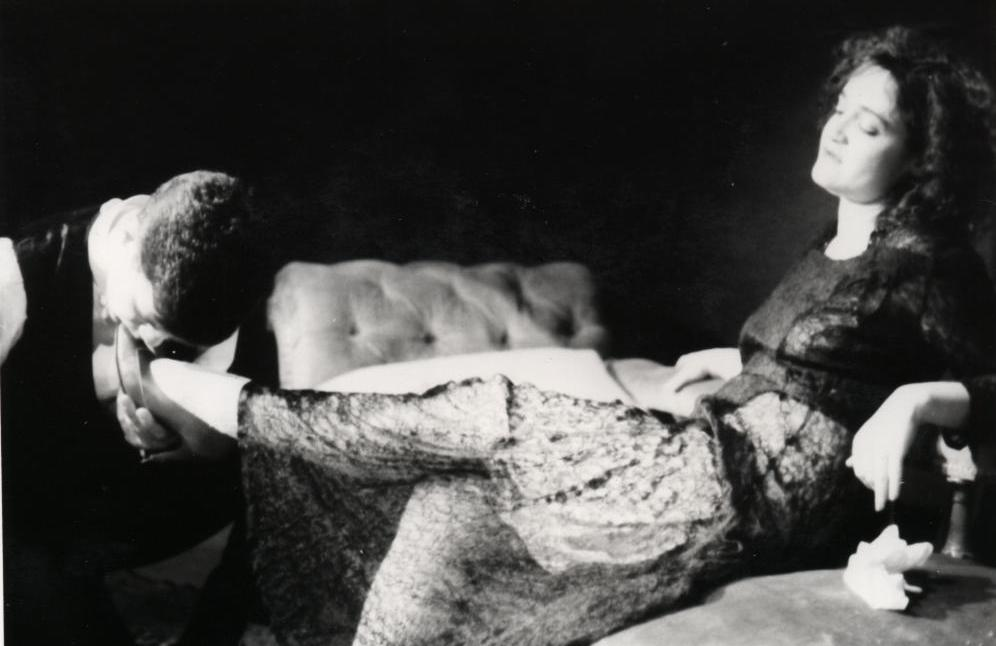
Angelique Rockas as Miss Julie and Garry Cooper as Jean, Internationalist Theatre 1984

- In 1913, with the title Countess Julia, it was directed by Mary Shaw on Broadway at the 48th Street Theatre for three performances.* In 1912, Anna Hofman-Uddgren directed a film version, based on her own and Gustaf Uddgren's screenplay; Manda Björling played Julie and August Falck played Jean (based in turn on the stage production in Stockholm in 1906).
- In 1935, it was revived at the Arts Theatre in London in a translation by Roy Campbell with Rosalinde Fuller as Julie and Robert Newton as Jean.
- In 1949, it was performed at the Lyric Theatre, Hammersmith, London with Joan Miller as Julie and Duncan Lamont as Jean.
- In 1950, Birgit Cullberg co-wrote and choreographed a ballet version to the music of Ture Rangström, which she directed twice for Swedish television, in 1959 and 1980.
- In 1960, it was performed in Elizabeth Sprigg's translation at the Lyric Theatre, Hammersmith, London with Diane Cilento as Julie and Leon Peers as Jean.
- In 1962, it was directed by Alf Sjöberg on Broadway at the Cort Theatre for three performances, with Inga Tidblad as Miss Julie and Ulf Palme as Jean.
- In 1983, Judy Davis and Colin Friels performed the play at the Nimrod Theatre in Sydney.
- The 1984 Internationalist Theatre London production was characterized by the disruption of ethnic preconceptions with a "small, dark" Angelique Rockas depicting Miss Julie in a performance of great depth. Garry Cooper played Jean.
- In 1995, Patrick Marber wrote and directed After Miss Julie, in which the events of the play were transposed to an English country house on the eve of the Labour Party's landslide 1945 General Election win. The play was staged in 2003.
- In 1995, Braham Murray directed a production at the Royal Exchange, Manchester with Amanda Donohoe as Miss Julie, Patrick O'Kane as Jean and Marie Francis as Christine.
- In 1995, a new version by Roger Sansom opened at the Kenneth More Theatre, London with Jay Berry and thereafter Juliet Dover as Julie, opposite Robert Flint as Jean.
- In July 2006, a new translation by Frank McGuinness was produced at the Theatre Royal, Bath by director Rachel O'Riordan. Set in 19th-century Northern Ireland; this version relies on the tension between the Roman Catholic Irish servant class and Anglo-Irish Protestant gentry to carry Strindberg's message to an English-speaking audience.
- In 2009, the Roundabout Theatre Company produced After Miss Julie in New York, directed by Mark Brokaw and starring Sienna Miller, Jonny Lee Miller and Marin Ireland (as Christine).
- In 2009, Toronto's CanStage staged a new version titled Miss Julie: Freedom Summer. Set in Mississippi in 1964, with Julie recontextualized as the daughter of a plantation owner and John as her father's African-American chauffeur, playwright Stephen Sachs wove in themes of racial violence and miscegeny against the backdrop of the American Civil Rights Movement. This production starred Caroline Cave and Kevin Hanchard.
- In 2010, The Schaubühne produced a new version from the perspective of the fiancée, Kristin's perspective with live video and foley effects directed by Katie Mitchell and Leo Warner.
- In 2011 on stage of Theatre of Nations (Moscow), directed by Thomas Ostermeier. The action of the play is set in contemporary Russia for which one of Russia's most called-for new generation playwrights, Mikhail Durnenkov, wrote especially for Theatre of Nations a new version of the play. All the main story lines are preserved, while the dialogues have been rewritten in modern lexicon.
- In 2012, Andrew Dallmeyer directed a Vagabond Productions version of the play in Edinburgh.
- In April 2012, Sarah Frankcom directed a 4-hand version by David Eldridge at the Royal Exchange, Manchester with Maxine Peake as Miss Julie, Joe Armstrong as Jean, Carla Henry as Kristin and Liam Gerrard as The Fiddler. Maxine Peake won a Manchester Theatre Award for best actress in 2013.
- In July 2012, Yaël Farber's contemporary reworking set in South Africa, titled Mies Julie, was premiered by Cape Town's Baxter Theatre Centre. The show was performed at the Edinburgh Festival Fringe 2012 as part of Assembly Festival's South African Season, then transferred to St. Ann's Warehouse in New York City and on 7 February 2014 opened at the Octagon Theatre in Perth (Western Australia) as part of the Perth International Arts Festival program.
- In May 2016, Melbourne Theatre Company presented an adaptation of Miss Julie adapted and directed by Kip Williams
- In May 2017, an adaptation by Garret David Kim and directed by Andrew Watkins was presented at Access theater in New York City.
- In 2018, a contemporary adaptation, Julie, by Polly Stenham starring Vanessa Kirby opened at the Royal National Theatre in London. It was broadcast worldwide as a National Theatre Live screening.
- In spring 2019, Queen of Basel, an adaptation by Hilary Bettis set during Miami's Art Basel festival, premiered at Studio Theatre in Washington, DC.
- In 2021, Amy Ng set a version in 1948 Hong Kong. It followed the plot quite faithfully but added the background of post World War 2 Hong Kong adjusting to life in the British Empire and the rise of Communist China. It played on-line and at The Southwark Playhouse in London.
- In 2021, Michael Omoke's adaptation “Miss Julie’s Happy Valley” had its world première in Denmark's Folketeatret and subsequently toured to Finland where it debuted at Helsinki University of Arts. Omoke's reworked script, set in Karen Blixen era Kenya under British rule of the first half in the last century, bases the title character, Miss Julie, as a portrait of countess Alice de Janze, the real life American Native New Yorker married into French Aristocracy, who scandalized British Kenya's "White Highlands" of 1920s - 1940s as the femme fatale member of Happy Valley. The expression “Happy Valley” was coined to a group of ultra-privileged Aristocrats infamous for their debauched hedonistic lifestyle in the colony ( at the expense of “natives” ) whose story was told in the 1980s film 'White Mischief'.They captured world imagination when their unelected leader, Josslyn Victor Hay 22nd Earl of Erroll was found dead in his Buick the morning of 28th Jan 1941. Countess Alice de Janze, whom Lord Erroll conducted a clandestine relationship with, tragically committed suicide the same year. To date, 81 years later, the crime remains one of the century's great unresolved mystery. ‘Miss Julie Happy Valley’ unequivocally solves it once and for all.
- In 2025, Theater for the New City, in New York, presented Strindberg Rep in a production adapted and directed by Robert Greer, which shifted Strindberg's story to a Long Island country estate in 1925. The final scene closed with Miss Julie returning to attack Jean. The cast included Natalie Menna as Miss Julie, Mike Roche as Jean and Holly O'Brien as Christine.
- In 2025, Katonah Classic Stage in Armonk, NY, produced “Miss Julie” in rep with the play “Venus in Fur” by David Ives. Lea DiMarchi played Miss Julie / Vanda, and James Wagner played Jean / Thomas. Kristine was played by Emma Claire Gibson, with additional performers Edie Roth, Aurora Villareal, Grace Miguel, Michelle Smith, Analisa Pisano, Jon Peacock, Scott Thomas, Tommy Froessel, Zlatin Ivanov, and instrumentalist Meredith Black as the Count's servants. The production was adapted and directed by Trent Dawson, and assistant directed by Analisa Pisano.

== Operas ==
- In 1965, it was adapted as an opera by Ned Rorem to an English libretto by Kenward Elmslie.
- In 1973, Antonio Bibalo wrote an opera (revised in 1975) which has been performed over 160 times in Germany.
- In 1977, William Alwyn's opera, with an English libretto adapted from the play by the composer, was premiered as a BBC Radio 3 broadcast.
- In 2005, it was adapted as an opera by Philippe Boesmans to a German libretto by Luc Bondy.
- In 2018, it was adapted (in a contemporary reworking) as an opera Juliana by Joseph Phibbs to an English libretto by Laurie Slade.

== Film and television ==
Miss Julie (1922), directed by Felix Basch

- In 1912, Anna Hofman-Uddgren directed a film version, based on her own and Gustaf Uddgren's screenplay; Manda Björling played Julie and August Falck played Jean (based in turn on the stage production in Stockholm in 1906).
- In 1922, Felix Basch directed the German silent version starring Asta Nielsen, William Dieterle, and Lina Lossen.
- In 1947, it was adapted as the Argentine film The Sin of Julia. It was directed by Mario Soffici and featured Amelia Bence and Alberto Closas as the main characters.
- In 1951, Alf Sjöberg made a film version from his own screenplay.
- In 1956, Dennis Vance directed a version for Armchair Theatre with Mai Zetterling and Tyrone Power as Julie and Jean.
- In 1956, Gabriel Axel directed a television movie starring Ingeborg Brams, Jørn Jeppesen and Lisbeth Movin.
- In 1960, Arild Brinchmann directed a television movie starring Urda Arneberg, Arne Lie, and Ragnhild Michelsen.
- In 1965, Alan Bridges wrote and directed a television movie for Theatre 625, starring Gunnel Lindblom, Ian Hendry and Stephanie Bidmead.
- In 1969, Keve Hjelm directed a television movie starring Bibi Andersson, Thommy Berggren and Kerstin Tidelius.
- In 1974, John Glenister and Robin Phillips directed a television movie with Helen Mirren and Donal McCann as Julie and Jean.
- In 1977, Patrick Tam directed 七女性 (Chuk Nu Sing/Seven Women), a seven-episode television anthology series depicting the stories of different women in late '70s Hong Kong, with Louise Lee playing a version of Miss Julie.
- In 1984, Yves-André Hubert directed a television movie starring Fanny Ardant, Niels Arestrup and Brigitte Catillon.
- In 1986, Bob Heaney and Mikael Wahlforss directed a television movie set in South Africa in the 1980s, in which the two main characters were separated by race as well as class and gender. It was based on a 1985 stage production at the Baxter Theatre in Cape Town. Sandra Prinsloo played Julie and John Kani played Jean.
- In 1987, Michael Simpson directed a television movie for Theatre Night in which Patrick Malahide played Jean and Janet McTeer played Julie.
- In 1991, David Ponting directed a television movie starring Sean Galuszka and Eleanor Comegys.
- In 1999, Mike Figgis directed a film version from a screenplay by Helen Cooper, starring Saffron Burrows and Peter Mullan.
- In 2012, Felice Cappa directed a television movie starring Valeria Solarino, Valter Malosti and Federica Fracassi.
- In 2013, Helena Bergström wrote and directed a television movie starring Nadja Mirmiran, Björn Bengtsson and Sofi Helleday.
- In 2013, Mikael Berg wrote and directed a television movie starring Nathalie Söderqvist, Klas Ekegren and Lina Englund.
- In 2014, Liv Ullmann directed a film adaptation set in Ireland, with Jessica Chastain as the eponymous character and Colin Farrell as Jean.
- In 2015, Fia-Stina-Sandlund directed the movie She's Wild Again Tonight, a contemporary and radical interpretation of Miss Julie starring Gustaf Norén and Shima Niavarani. With feminism and anti-racism as weapons, She's Wild Again Tonight examines the modern gender roles in the young urban conscious sphere and blurs the boundaries between reality, drama and fiction.

== In popular culture ==
In season 3 of the TV series The Marvelous Mrs. Maisel, Sophie Lennon (played by Jane Lynch) plays the titular character in a disastrous adaptation of the play.
