= Theatro Technis =

Theatre in London

Coordinates: 51.53546°N 0.13469°W

- Interactive map of Theatro Technis
- Address: 26 Crowndale Road; London; United Kingdom
- Capacity: 120
- Type: Theatre
- Public transit: Mornington Crescent, Camden Town; King's Cross St Pancrass

Construction
- Opened: 1978; 48 years ago

Website
- theatrotechnis.com
- Company
- Type: Charity
- Founded: 1957; 69 years ago
- Founder: George Eugeniou
- Key people: Kerry Kyriacos Michael MBE (Creative Director)

Theatro Technis is an independent multi-cultural arts centre with a 120-seat theatre located in the heart of London Borough of Camden. It contributes in general and specific ways to the cultural and social life of the people of London.

== General contribution to the cultural diversity of London. ==
- Providing in-house productions of ancient Greek Drama in the English language and for which it is noted.
- A performance space for innovative interpretations of classics, e.g. Shakespeare, Chekov, and Dostoyevski and other classics by visiting, next generation directors.
- Hosting foreign language productions.
- A platform for political theatre, most notably The Madness of George Dubya which had been rejected by almost all of London venues. Michael Billington of the Guardian remarked "The most cheering aspect of the year was the varied and rapid response to the Iraq crisis. At Theatro Technis, Justin Butcher wrote and directed The Madness of George Dubya - ignored by most critics until it transferred to the West End."

== Specific and historical contribution ==
- To serve the “educational and cultural needs” of the Cypriot Greek and Greek communities of the UK, and which was the original raison d`etre by its founder George Eugeniou, and a group of fellow actors and creatives: 1) staging dramas that explored the socio-economic, immigration and refugee concerns that impact this community, revealing the trauma of the Turkish invasion of Cyprus, the ethnic cleansing that ensued and its tragic aftermath.
- Organizing the annual community festival of “Cyprus Week”
- Hosting the London Greek Film Festival in conjunction with ERT1 TV and the Thessaloniki Film Festival.

== History ==
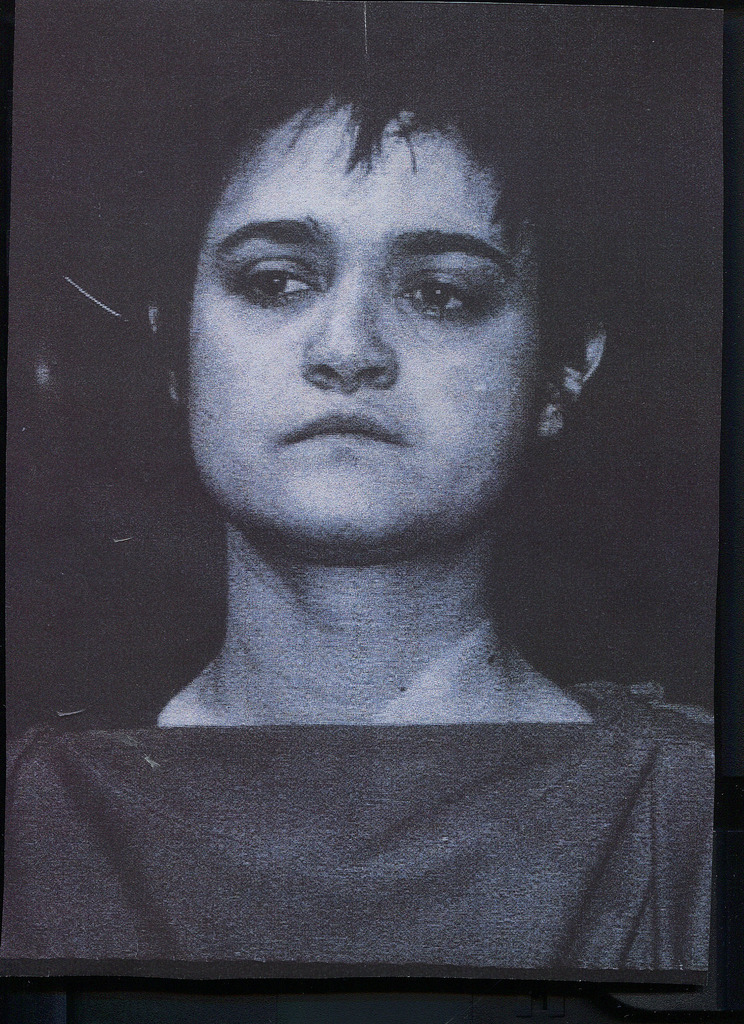
Angelique Rockas as Medea, Theatro Technis, 1982

Originally founded in 1957 by George Eugeniou and a group of actors five decades ago, Theatro Technis first started its work in an old unused warehouse located in the backyard of King's Cross. Then after a monumental struggle and continued threats to its existence, in 1978, it finally found its permanent home in an old Church building where it has flourished into a centre of multi-faceted and multi-cultural activities.

=== Selection of Productions ===
- Sophocles Oedipus King
- Prometheus Bound
- Medea (play)
- Lysistrata
- The Persians
- Antigone
- King Lear
- A Midsummer Night's Dream
- Macbeth
- Three Sisters
- The Idiot
- Le Petit Prince (in French)
- La casa de Bernarda Alba (in Spanish)
- Kato Apo tis Keratsies by Stavros Lilitos (in Greek)
- Siamese Twins by Griselda Gambaro
- The Madness of George Dubya by Justin Butcher
- We, Macbeth by James Hepburn
- Dowry with Two White Doves
- Afrodite Unbound
- The National Engagement
- A Revolutionary Nicknamed Roosevelt
- The Best of Tofias
- Contract
- Hands Tied, Tied Hand
- Gringland
- Searching for the Lemons
- The Fire Burns where it Falls, and Two Lives
- Cyprus Trilogy
- The Hole

UK actors of Greek descent nurtured by Theatro Technis include Andreas Markou, Stelios Kyriacou, Andy Lysandrou, Spyros Kyprianou, Maroula Eugeniou, Peter Polycarpou, Angelique Rockas, Anna Savva, Alkis Kritikos, George Savvides, Jackie Skarvellis.

=== Educational schemes ===
The Tasty Plays by Scene & Heard, 'a unique mentoring project that sees local kids join forces with volunteer actors, writers and directors to create theatre'. Theatro Technis also offers one year free internships in theatre practice for aspiring young directors, supervised by George Eugeniou.

=== The Humanitarian Arm of Theatro Technis ===
Theatro Technis runs a citizens advisory service for the local Greek Cypriot community as well as the Camden community.
