= In the Bar of a Tokyo Hotel =

Play by Tennessee Williams

First production program

In the Bar of a Tokyo Hotel is a one-act play in two scenes, written in 1968–69 by Tennessee Williams.

== Synopsis ==
Mark is an alcoholic painter on the verge of a nervous breakdown who is trying to boost his sagging career by developing a new style in his Tokyo hotel room. Instead, he has convinced himself he is the first artist to discover color, and it appears he has drifted into psychosis as he spreads canvases on the floor, sprays paint at them with a spray gun, and rolls around on them in the nude.

Meanwhile, his promiscuous wife Miriam, a typical Ugly American, is loudly and crudely trying to seduce the bartender in the hotel lounge. Anxious to be free of her husband without losing his financial support, she has contacted his Manhattan art dealer and close friend Leonard and asked him to join them in Japan. When he arrives, she tries to persuade him to take her husband back to New York, but Mark dies. Feeling lost and without direction, she laments, "I have no plans. I have nowhere to go" as the curtain falls.

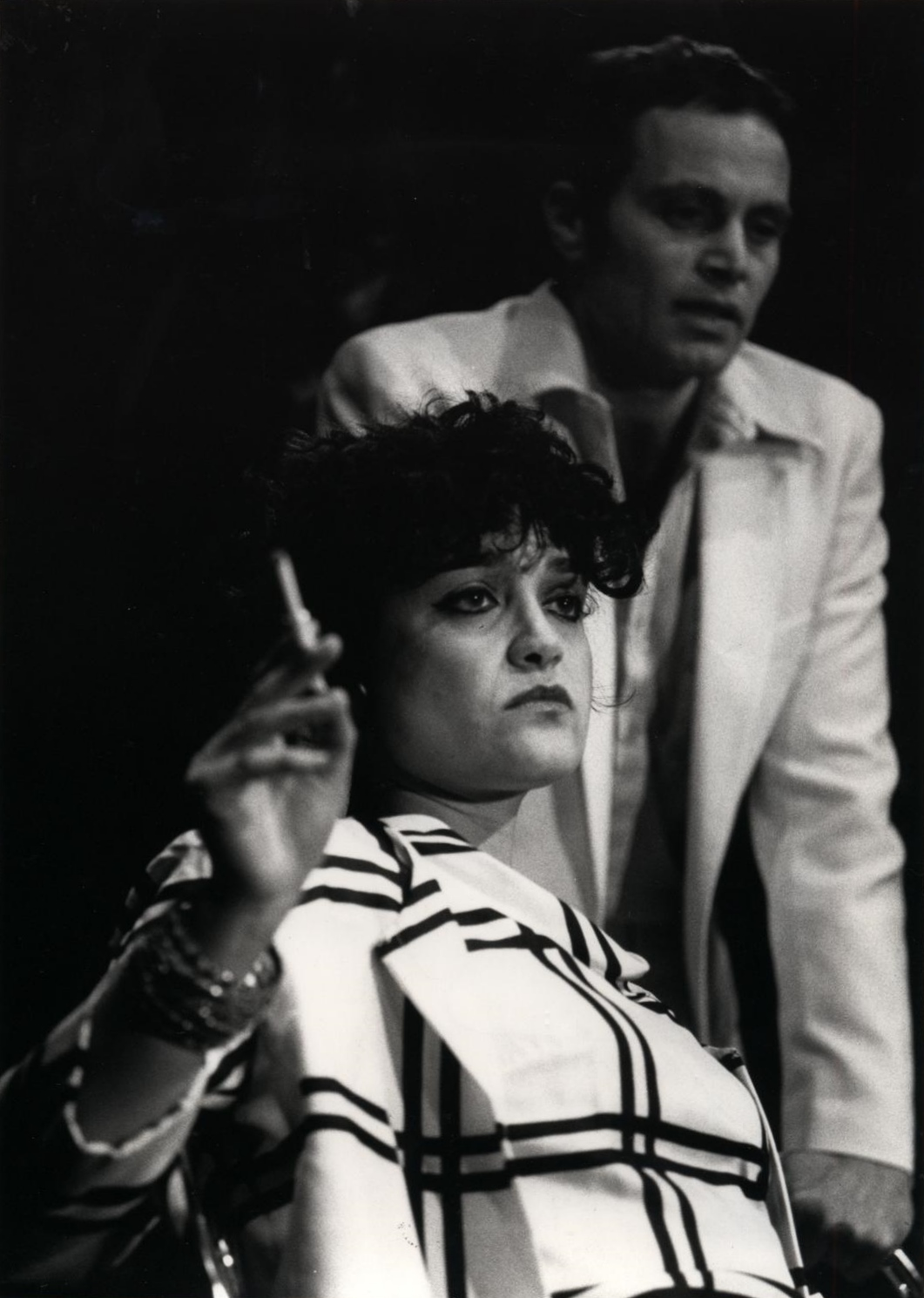
Angelique Rockas as Miriam, Nic d`avirro as Mark Internationalist Theatre

== Production ==
Although credited to the direction by Herbert Machiz, Tennessee Williams took over the direction and staged the play himself for its off-Broadway premiere at the Eastside Playhouse on May 11, 1969. It ran for 25 performances. The cast included Donald Madden as Mark, Anne Meacham as Miriam, and Lester Rawlins as Leonard.

The British premiere of the play was given by Internationalist Theatre in July 1983 at the New End Theatre Hampstead, London, with Nic d`Avirro as Mark, Angelique Rockas as Miriam, directed by Alkis Kritikos, and designed by Stewart Laing.

In February 2007, the White Horse Theater Company mounted a revival directed by Cyndy Marion at the Abingdon Theatre Arts Complex in the Chelsea neighborhood of Manhattan.

In March 2012, 292 Theatre at 292 E. 3rd Street in New York City mounted a 15-day run of the play starring Charles Schick, Regina Bartkoff, Brandon Lim and Wayne Henry.

In April 2016, a month-long run was mounted at the Charing Cross Theatre, London. The production starred Linda Marlowe.

== Critical reception ==
In the New York Times, Clive Barnes said of the original 1969 production, "The play seems almost too personal, and as a result too painful, to be seen in the cold light of public scrutiny. Mr. Williams has, perhaps, never been overreluctant to show the world his wounds — but in his new play he seems to be doing nothing else ... This is Mr. Williams's sad bird of loneliness — and, although the play repelled me it fascinated me with the author's occasional sudden resurgence of skill — there are plaintive notes of poetry recalling Williams at his very best ... There are more flashes of genius here than in any of his later plays. Mixed with the feeble jokes ... and all the hesitations of style the play is heir to, there is gold, gossamer and fire here, and there are bursting sharp exchanges of dialogue that recall The Glass Menagerie in their suddenly poignant pertinence ... A strange play — but unlike Mr. Williams's previous play, it definitely makes me look forward to his next. But more pity and less self would be a distinct advantage."

The direction of the 1983 Internationalist Theatre production was described as powerful, the performances "very fine " and Angelique Rockas` Miriam "spellbinding".

Reviewing the 2007 production for Variety, Mark Blankenship stated, "Flaws aside, the current revival by White Horse Theater proves the play is worth remembering ... As in earlier experiments such as Camino Real, Williams fractures language to enhance the unrealistic mood ... This tactic points to the play's success in making palpable moments out of emotional concepts. Williams never quite integrates his metaphors with action ... but his insights are still worth hearing."

Filmink argued the play "would've made a terrific movie."
