= Marguerite Feitlowitz =

Marguerite Feitlowitz is an American author and translator whose work has focused on "languages-within-languages" and the way disaster "affects our relationship to language." She is the author of A Lexicon of Terror: Argentina and the Legacies of Torture, a 1998 New York Times Notable Book and a finalist for the L. L. Winship/PEN New England Award, as well as numerous essays and translations.

A vocal critic of the Bush administration's human rights record, Feitlowitz has published a number of articles on the subject in Salon and The International Herald Tribune

She is a professor of Literature at Bennington College in Vermont.

== Bibliography ==
=== Books ===
- 2011 [1998]. A Lexicon of Terror: Argentina and the Legacies of Torture. Oxford University Press. ISBN 978-0-199-74469-5.

=== Translations ===
- 1992. Information for Foreigners: Three Plays. Gambaro, Griselda. Northwestern University Press. 978-0810110335.
- 1994. Bad Blood (La malasangre). Gambaro, Griselda. Dramatic Publishing. ISBN 978-0871294586.
- 2014. Pillar of Salt: An Autobiography, with 19 Erotic Sonnets. Novo, Salvador. University of Texas Press. ISBN 978-0-292-70541-8
