= Juan Carlos Distéfano =

Argentine sculptor (1933–2026)

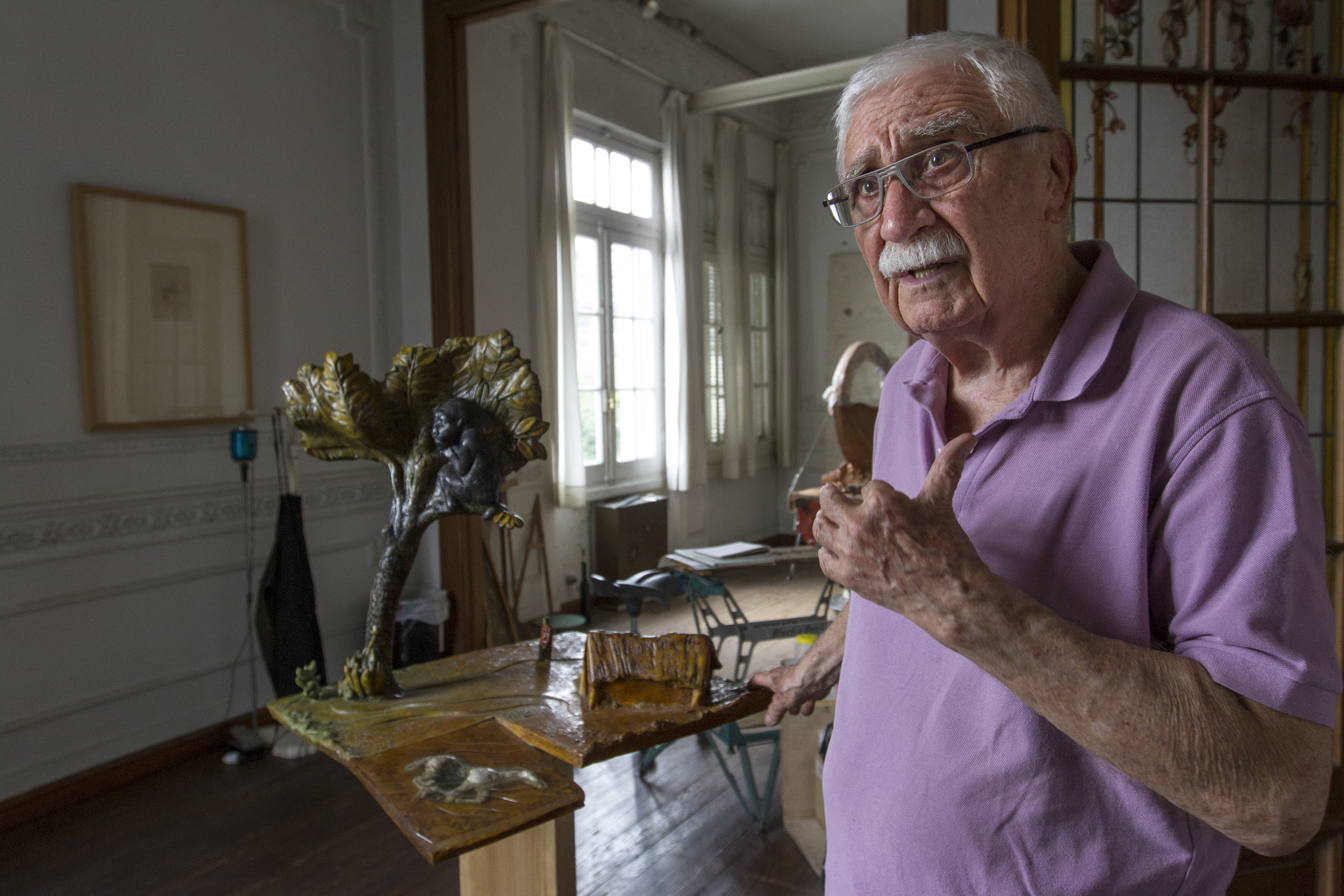
- Distéfano in 2019
- Born: 29 August 1933; Villa Celina, Buenos Aires Province, Argentina
- Died: 25 July 2026 (aged 92); Buenos Aires, Argentina
- Education: Escuela Nacional de Artes Gráficas No.9; Escuela Nacional de Bellas Artes Manuel Belgrano
- Spouse: Griselda Gambaro (m. 1955)
- Awards: Konex Platinum Award for Figurative Sculpture (1982); Konex Brilliant Award for Visual Arts (1992); Venice Biennale representative for Argentina (2015); Gran Premio a la Trayectoria Artística (2018)

Juan Carlos Distéfano (29 August 1933 – 25 July 2026) was an Argentine sculptor, graphic designer and educator. He served as the director of the Graphic Design Department at the Instituto Di Tella in Buenos Aires. Distéfano represented Argentina at the 56th Venice Biennale in 2015 and was awarded the Konex Brilliant Award for Visual Arts in 1992.

== Early life and career ==
Juan Carlos Distéfano was born in Villa Celina, Buenos Aires Province on 29 August 1933. He was the son of an Italian immigrant father and an Argentine mother of Spanish descent.

In 1947, he enrolled in the Escuela Nacional de Artes Gráficas No.9 when he was thirteen years old, He then studied at the Escuela Nacional de Bellas Artes Manuel Belgrano in Buenos Aires and got qualified as an art teacher. During this studying term, he studied under notable Argentine artists such as Demetrio Urruchúa, Aurelio Macchi, and Onofre Pacenza.

Between 1960 and 1970, Distéfano was the graphic director of the Visual Arts Center at the Torcuato di Tella Institute. From 1968 onwards, he dedicated himself to sculpture, with a marked connection between his sculptural works and his paintings. He won the Francisco Romero Scholarship awarded by the Fondo Nacional de las Artes for the Arts and the Italian Embassy in Argentina in 1970. In 1976, he abandoned graphic design to dedicate himself exclusively to sculpture. In 1977, he was forced into exile due to the banning of his wife's novel "Ganarse la muerte" by the Argentine military dictatorship. He lived in Spain between 1977 and 1980.

In 1982, Distéfano was awarded the Konex Award for Figurative Sculpture, and in 1992 the Konex Award for Visual Arts.

== Personal life and death ==
In 1955, he married the writer Griselda Gambaro.

Distéfano died in Buenos Aires on 25 July 2026, at the age of 92.
