= Internationalist Theatre =

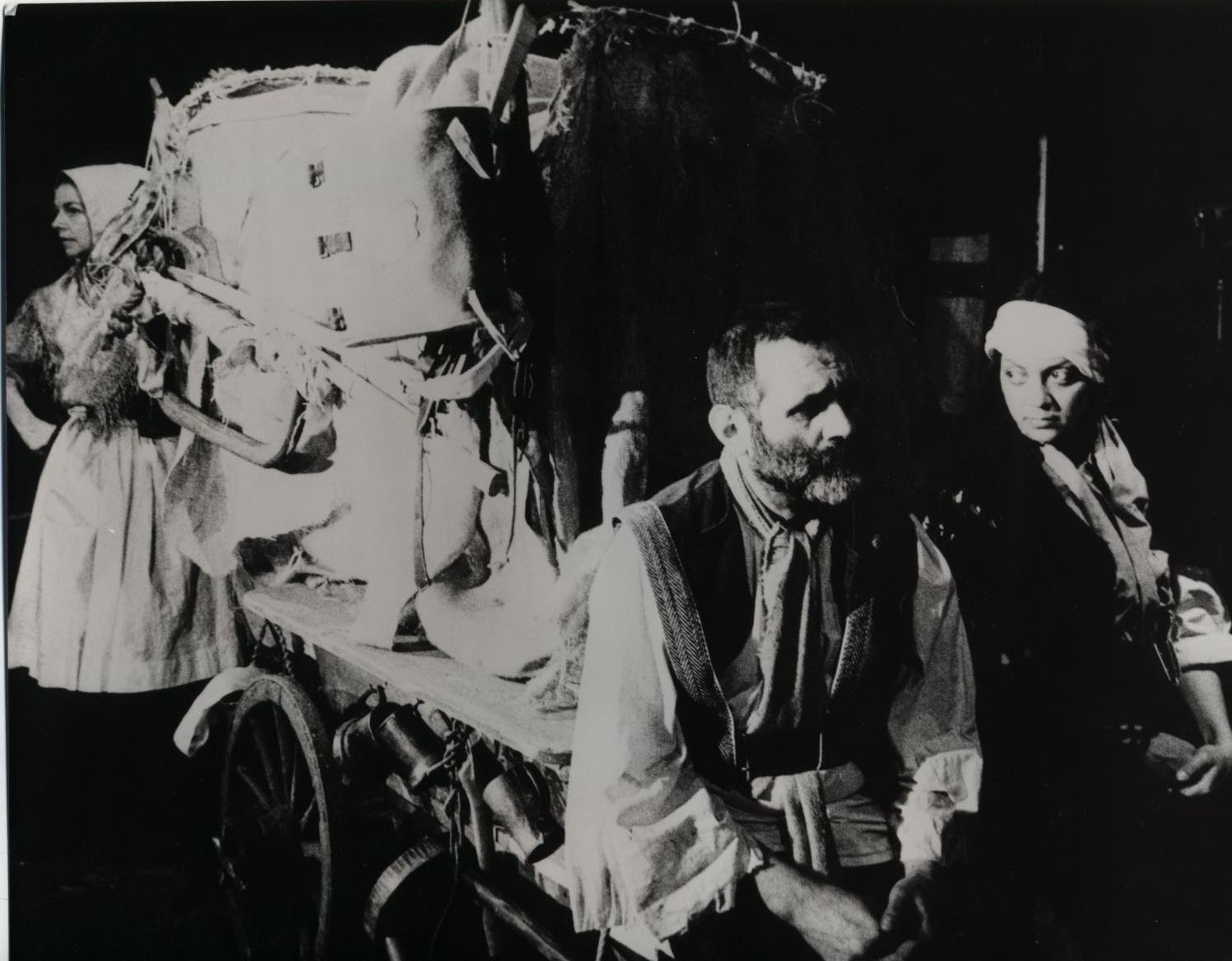
Renu Setna as Chaplain, Josephine Welcome as Kattrin, Margaret Robertson as Mother Courage, in Mother Courage and Her Children by Bertolt Brecht, Internationalist Theatre

Internationalist Theatre is a London theatre company founded by South African Greek actress Angelique Rockas in September 1980. The company was originally named New Internationalist Theatre, with an intention to pursue an internationalist approach in its choice of plays as well as "a multi-racial drama policy, with an even mix of performers drawn from different cultural groups", The Stage, April 1981.

The theatre has received coverage from stage papers around the world. It received charity status in 1986.

== Performances ==
The Internationalist Theatre has put on plays by Jean Genet (The Balcony), Griselda Gambaro (The Camp), Brecht (Mother Courage and Her Children), Luigi Pirandello (Liolà), Tennessee Williams (In the Bar of a Tokyo Hotel), August Strindberg (Miss Julie) and Maxim Gorky (Enemies). Their critical reception was generally favourable, although not universally. Time Out magazine disliked their production of Mother Courage: "the casting only inspires a whole host of irreverent questions: what on earth, say, is an American sergeant doing in seventeenth century Europe? And how did a Pakistani chaplain get into the Swedish army?" An example of the resistance to diversity casting at this point of time to a theatre first of a multi-racial Mother Courage production. The Pakistani actor referred to by Malcolm Hay was the veteran Asian Parsi actor Renu Setna. The Financial Times found Liolà`s multi-national casting problematic: "do we really need this peculiar medley of Italian accents for the English premiere? The problem is compounded by the commitment ... to a multi-national cast ... English, German, Sicilian, and Italian actors produce widely differing versions of the Latin lilt."

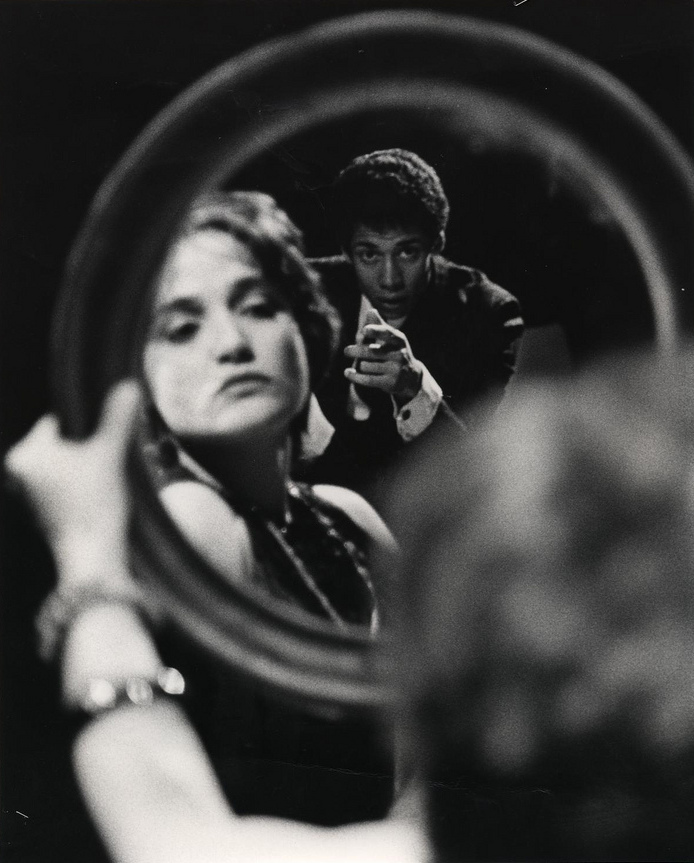
Angelique Rockas as Carmen with Okon Jones in Genet's The Balcony, Internationalist Theatre

== The Historical-Political Dimension of the work of Internationalist Theatre ==
The theatre's political works include:

- Griselda Gambaro`s The Camp (October,1981), an anti-junta protest play which "relentlessly exposes and explores the psychology of fascism ... draws its political parallels by reference to Nazi concentration camps". Argentina at the time of Gambaro writing this play was ruled by a Junta and Gambaro was in Exile in Spain.
- Jean Genet, The Balcony (July 1981): "a comment on power and political manoeuvre ... While the ruling classes, the icons and figureheads fiddle, society burns around them" . The performance coincided with the outbreak of the Brixton Riots in London.
- Bertolt Brecht, Mother Courage and Her Children (1982 May)" "whose attack on the practice of war could not- with south atlantic news filling the front pages- have been more topical...prompted the questions it should." (Falklands War)
- Maxim Gorky, Enemies, (March 1985)``One critic saw a parallel between the workers' uprising in Enemies and the Miners' Strike that had been running in the UK since 1984, saying, " it is about the miners strike " UK miners' strike (1984–85). Gorky`s "pseudo-populism" is done away with in this production by the actors speaking "without distinctive accents and consequently without populist sentiment."

== See also ==
- Intercultural theatre
- Political drama
