= Information For Foreigners =

Information for Foreigners is a play by Griselda Gambaro written in 1971. It is a promenade style site-specific theatre piece in which the audience is led on a tour through a large house by a guide. Gambaro uses the play to discuss the lives of the desaparecidos, and to simultaneously explore the nature of theatrical forms, and the expectations of an audience.

The play consists of twenty scenes as multiple groups of audience members are led through a large house to different rooms and hallways where the scenes are presented.

== Plot summary ==
The play includes twenty different scenes featuring a range of characters and story lines. For example, in scene three the group visits a room in which a girl in wet clothes is sitting in a chair, and man yells at her and gives her a gun. In scene four, the audience witnesses a recreation of the Milgram experiment. In the last scene, each of the guides leads their groups into one large room to watch the final scene together. The guides ask the audience to stand against the wall, leaving space in the center, which is where the remainder of the show takes place.

== Analysis ==
The play introduces the audience to two levels of performance where they are shown both finished scenes, as well as what appear to be private and unfinished moments. Critic W. B. Worthen notes that "In many respects, Information for Foreigners is a play about its audience... the Milgram experiment provides a kind of metaphor for the audience's function... in that observation repeatedly involves the audience in a kind of deference to authority."
