= Griselda Gambaro =

Argentine writer (1928–2026)

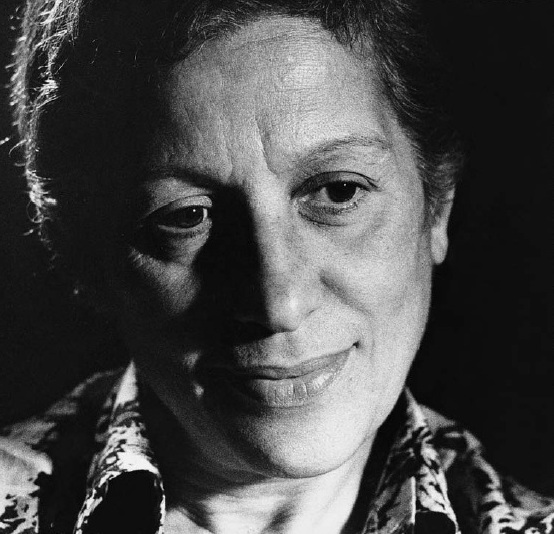
- Gambaro in a 1970 publication
- Born: 28 July 1928; Buenos Aires, Argentina
- Died: 15 September 2026 (aged 98); Buenos Aires, Argentina
- Occupation: Writer
- Spouse: Juan Carlos Distéfano (died 2026)

Griselda Gambaro (24 July 1928 – 15 September 2026) was an Argentine writer, whose novels, plays, short stories, story tales, essays and novels for teenagers often concern the political violence in her home country that would develop into the Dirty War. One recurring theme is the desaparecidos and the attempts to recover their bodies and memorialize them. Her novel Ganarse la muerte was banned by the government because of the obvious political message.

Gambaro was a celebrated playwright, and she was awarded a Guggenheim Fellowship in 1982, as well as many other prizes as well as the distinction of Illustrious Citizen of Buenos Aires.

== Background ==
Gambaro was born in a working-class neighborhood of Buenos Aires on 28 July 1928 to parents who had immigrated from Genoa, Italy. She was the youngest of five children. She emerged as a writer in the 1960s.

Gambaro's 1977 novel Ganarse la muerte (To Earn One's Death), which vividly portrayed state violence, was banned by the Argentine junta as "contrary to the institution of the family and to the social order", leading to her three years of self-imposed exile in Barcelona, Spain. After her return to Argentina, she became associated with the Teatro Abierto movement of creative and performing artists, which challenged the military dictatorship.

Gambaro died in Buenos Aires on 15 September 2026, at the age of 98, two months after her husband, Juan Carlos Distéfano.

== Selected works in English translation ==
- The Camp by Griselda Gambaro. Play. Translated by William Oliver in 1971; first staged performance in UK in 1981 by the Internationalist Theatre company.
- The Impenetrable Madam X. Novel. Translated by Evelyn Picon Garfield. by Griselda Gambaro (1991)
- Information For Foreigners by Griselda Gambaro and Marguerite Feitlowitz. Contains 3 plays: The Walls, Information for Foreigners, and, Antigona Furiosa. Edited, Translated and with an Introduction by Marguerite Feitlowitz. With an afterword by Diana Taylor (1 March 1992)
- Saying Yes. Play. Sebastian Doggart, Nick Hern Books, 1996.
- Siamese Twins by Griselda Gambaro and Gwen MacKeith (1 September 2011).

== Selected performances in the United Kingdom ==
- In October 1981, the New Internationalist Theatre launched the English language premiere of Gambaro's The Camp in London at the Africa Centre and York and Albany. The date was chosen to coincide with the publication by the IADA (International Association in the Defence of Artists (Paris)) on the ongoing cultural repression by the Argentine regime, which also provided a list of disappeared artists and intellectuals. Michelene Wandor described the play as coming "from the school of allegorical theatre of oppression, written in a society in which brutality and censorship suppress democracy and the imagination".
- In September 2011, The Siamese Twins (translated by Gwen MacKeith) had its UK premiere directed by Mara Lockowandt and Jorge Perez Falconi for the Silver Lining Theatre and performed at Theatro Technis. Jonathan Lovett for The Stage noted that the UK premiere was "long overdue" and called it an "atmospheric production" that "weav[es] comedy into menace, and vice versa". Howard Loxton for the British Theatre Guide wrote of Siamese Twins that, "on one hand this play is an outcry and a prescient warning about this the misuse of authority and fearful acquiescence before it and on the other a picture of the exploitation, cruelty and even torture that even partners or siblings can inflict upon each other."

== Selected works in Spanish ==
- Madrigal en ciudad. Tales. Ed. Goyanarte, Buenos Aires, 1963.
- El Desatino. Tales. Emecé Editores, Buenos Aires, 1965.
- Una felicidad con menos pena. Novel. Ed. Sudamericana, Buenos Aires, 1967.
- El Campo. Play, 1967.
- Nada que ver con otra historia. Novel. Ediciones Noé, Buenos Aires, 1972; 2ª ed, Torres Agüero Editor, Buenos Aires, 1987.
- La cola mágica. Story tales. Ediciones de la Flor, Buenos Aires, 1976.
- Conversaciones con chicos. Sobre la sociedad, los padres, los afectos, la cultura. Timerman Editores, 1976; Ediciones Siglo XX, 1983.
- Ganarse la muerte. Novel. Ediciones de la Flor, Buenos Aires, 1976.
- Dios no nos quiere contentos. Novel. Ed. Lumen, Barcelona, 1979.
- Lo impenetrable. Novela. Torres Agüero Editor, Buenos Aires, 1984 and 1988.
- Teatro 1. Including the plays "Real envido", "La malasangre" ("Bad blood") y "Del sol naciente" ("Rising Sun"). Ediciones de la Flor, Buenos Aires, 1997 (3ª edición).
- Teatro 2. Plays: "Dar la vuelta", "Información para extranjeros" ("Information for foreigners"), "Puesta en claro" y "Sucede lo que pasa". Ediciones de la Flor, Buenos Aires, 1995 (2ª edición).
- Teatro 3. "Viaje de invierno", "Nosferatu", "Cuatro ejercicios para actrices", "Acuerdo para cambiar de casa","Sólo un aspecto", "La gracia", "El miedo", "El nombre", "El viaje a Bahía Blanca", "El despojamiento", "Decir sí" and "Antígona furiosa". Ediciones de la Flor, Buenos Aires, 1997 (3ra. edición).
- Teatro 4. "Las paredes" ("The walls"), "El desatino", "Los siameses" ("Siamese twins), "El campo" ("The camp") y "Nada que ver". Ediciones de la Flor, Buenos Aires, 1990 (2ª edición).
- Teatro 5. "Efectos personales", "Desafiar al destino", "Morgan" and "Penas sin importancia". Ediciones de la Flor, Buenos Aires, 1991.
- Teatro 6. "Atando cabos", "La casa sin sosiego", "Es necesario entender un poco". Ediciones de la Flor, Buenos Aires, 1996.
- Después del día de fiesta. Novel. Editorial Seix Barral, Buenos Aires, 1994.
- Lo mejor que se tiene. Stories. Grupo Editorial Norma, 1997.
- Escritos inocentes. Essays. Grupo Editorial Norma, Buenos Aires, 1999.
- El mar que nos trajo. Novel. Editorial Norma, Buenos Aires, 2002.
- Teatro (cinco piezas). Grupo Editorial Norma, Buenos Aires, 2002.
- Promesas y desvaríos. Novel. Grupo Editorial Norma, Buenos Aires, 2004.
- Teatro 7. Plays: "No hay normales", "En la columna", "Pisar el palito", "Para llevarle a Rosita", "Cinco ejercicios para un actor", "Almas" ("Souls"). Ediciones de la Flor, Buenos Aires, 2004.
- A nadar con María Inés. Novel. Editorial Alfaguara (For kids and teenagers), Buenos Aires, 2005.

== See also ==
- Lists of writers
