= Hyperphas =

In Greek mythology, Hyperphas (Ancient Greek: Ὑπέρφαντος) was a leader of the Phlegyans and an ally of the Thebans. He was the father of Euryganeia who, according to Pausanias, married Oedipus after the death of Iocaste; Pausanias also maintains that it was she, and not Iocaste, who bore Oedipus his four children (Eteocles, Polynices, Antigone and Ismene). Defending this version, Pausanias refers to the poem Oedipodea and to a painting by Onasias, which depicted Euryganeia in grief over the conflict between her sons.

According to Hesiod, Hyperphas had another daughter, Euryanassa, who became the mother of Minyas by Poseidon.
