= Broteas (son of Tantalus) =

Mythical character

In Greek mythology, Broteas (Ancient Greek: Βροτέας, lit. 'mortal' or 'man'), was the son of the infamous King Tantalus.

== Family ==
Broteas' mother was either (1) Euryanassa, daughter of the river god Pactolus; (2) Eurythemista, daughter of the river-god Xanthus; (3) Eupryto and lastly, (4) Clytia, the child of Amphidamas. Thus, the brother of Niobe and Pelops.

== Mythology ==
According to a tradition of the Magnesians, Broteas carved the most ancient statue of the Mother of the Gods on the rock of Coddinos which is still to be seen on the side of Mount Sipylus, about three hundred feet above the plain.

== Manisa relief ==
This ancient rock carving was famous in antiquity. It's located near the town of Magnesia ad Sipylum, and it was believed to have been carved by Broteas. He was said to have carved the most ancient image of the Great Mother of the Gods (Cybele), an image that in Pausanias' day (2nd century CE) was still held sacred by the Magnesians.

The sculpture was carved into the rock-face of the crag Coddinus, north of Spil Mount-Mount Sipylus, whose daemon was one of the mythographers' candidates for Broteas' grandfather.

The rock-cut carving mentioned by Pausanias was identified with the Manisa relief in 1881 by W. M. Ramsay and is still to be seen above the road about 6 or 7 km east of Manisa (the modern descendant of Magnesia ad Sipylum), though the head has partly cleaved away, from natural causes. The figure 8–10 metres high carved in a recess in the a cliff-face a hundred metres above the marshy plain near the village of Akpinar, has come to be confused with a nearby natural rock formation associated with Niobe, the "Niobe of Sipylus" (the "Weeping Rock", in Turkish Ağlayan Kaya), also mentioned by Pausanias.

Apart from the badly damaged head, the sitting figure is clear enough to be made out by a non-professional. The goddess with the polos headgear holds her breasts with her hands; a vague trace of four Hittite hieroglyphics could be seen on a squared section to the right of her head. The site is Hittite, second millennium BCE.

Nearby, other archaeological sites traditionally associated with the House of Tantalus since Antiquity are also in fact Hittite. Some 2 km east of Akpınar there are another two monuments on Spil Mount, which are also mentioned by Pausanias: the tomb of Tantalus (Christianized as "Saint Charalambos' tomb") and the "throne of Pelops", in fact a rocky altar.
