= Astymedusa =

Mycenaean princess in Greek mythology

In Greek mythology, Astymedusa (Ancient Greek: Ἀστυμέδουσα, romanized: Astymédousa) or simply Medusa, was a Mycenaean princess as daughter of King Sthenelus and Nicippe, daughter of Pelops.

She was occasionally named as a later wife of Oedipus. After parting with Jocasta or after the death of Euryganeia, who was his second wife, Oedipus married Astymedousa. Astymedusa accused Polynices and Eteocles of attempting to rape her, thus driving Oedipus into a frenzy. This is held as an alternate cause for the curse which led to the fraternal discord at the heart of the myth of the wars at Thebes.

== Bibliography ==
- Watson, P.A. (1994), Ancient Stepmothers: Myth, Misogyny and Reality, Leiden, ISBN 9004101764.
