= Oedipodea =

Lost Ancient Greek poem

The Oedipodea (Ancient Greek: Οἰδιπόδεια, romanized: Oidipódeia) is a lost poem of the Theban cycle, a part of the Epic Cycle (Επικὸς Κύκλος). The poem was about 6,600 verses long and the authorship was credited by ancient authorities to Cinaethon (Κιναίθων), a barely-known poet who probably lived in Sparta. Eusebius says that he flourished in 764/3 BC. Only three short fragments and one testimonium survived.

The Oedipodea told the story of the Sphinx and Oedipus and presented an alternative view of the Oedipus myth. According to Pausanias, Cinaethon states that the marriage between Oedipus and his own mother, Jocasta, was childless; his children had been born from another engagement with Euryganeia (Εὐρυγανεία), daughter of Hyperphas (Ὑπέρφας). That is all we know about these two characters.

A small glimpse of Cinaethon's style survives in Plutarch's On the Pythia's Oracles 407b: "he added unnecessary pomp and drama to the oracles".

== Select editions and translations ==
=== Critical editions ===
- Kinkel, G. (1877), Epicorum Graecorum fragmenta, vol. 1, Leipzig: B.G. Teubneri.
- Allen, T.W. (1912), Homeri opera. Tomus V: Hymni, Cyclus, Fragmenta, Margites, Batrachomyomachia, Vitae, Oxford University Press, ISBN 0-19-814534-9.
- Bernabé, A. (1988), Poetae epici Graecae, vol. 1, Leipzig: Teubner, ISBN 978-3-598-71706-2.
- Davies, M. (1988), Epicorum Graecorum fragmenta, Göttingen: Vandenhoeck & Ruprecht, ISBN 978-3-525-25747-0.

=== Translations ===
- Evelyn-White, H.G. (1936), Hesiod, the Homeric Hymns, and Homerica (3rd rev. ed.), Cambridge, Massachusetts.
  - —— (1914), Hesiod, the Homeric Hymns, and Homerica, Cambridge, Massachusetts: The MacMillan Co, ISBN 978-0-674-99063-0. English translation with facing Greek text; now obsolete except for its translations of the ancient quotations.
- West, M.L. (2003), Greek Epic Fragments, Cambridge, Massachusetts: Harvard University Press, ISBN 978-0-674-99605-2. Greek text with facing English translation

== Bibliography ==
- Davies, M. (1989), Greek Epic Cycle, London, ISBN 978-1-85399-039-7.
