= Euryganeia =

Daughter of Hyperphas in Greek mythology

In Greek mythology, Euryganeia (Ancient Greek: Εὐρυγάνεια, romanized: Eurygáneia) was a Theban queen. She was one of Oedipus' wives, and in rarer traditions the mother of his four notable children, Eteocles, Polynices, Antigone and Ismene.

== Family ==
Euryganeia was either a daughter of Hyperphas, and thus, sister to Euryanassa. In some sources, she was described as Jocasta's sister, which would make her Oedipus' aunt. Euryganeia was occasionally named as Oedipus' second wife and the mother of his children, Polynices, Eteocles, Ismene and Antigone.

According to Pausanias, the statement at Odyssey 11.274—that the gods soon made the incestuous marriage between Oedipus and his mother Jocasta known—is incompatible with her bearing four children to him. The geographer cites the lost epic poem Oedipodea as evidence for the fact that Euryganeia was actually the mother of Oedipus' brood. Pherecydes, on the other hand, attributed two sons (named Phrastor and Laonytus) to the marriage of Jocasta and Oedipus, but agreed that the more famous foursome were the children of Euryganeia.

== Mythology ==
There was a painting of Euryganeia at Plataea in which she was depicted as mournful because of the strife between her children. Following Euryganeia's death, Oedipus married Astymedusa, who plotted against her stepsons.

== See also ==
- Antiope
- Dirce
- Aëdon
