= Euryanassa =

In Greek mythology, Euryanassa (Ancient Greek: Εὐρυάνασσα, lit. 'wide queen' or 'ruling far and wide') is a name that may refer to the following women:

- Euryanassa, daughter of the river-god Pactolus. She was the wife of Tantalus, and one of the possible mothers of Pelops, Broteas and Niobe.
- Euryanassa, daughter of Hyperphas, leader of the Phlegyans and thus, sister to Euryganeia, wife of Oedipus. She was the mother of Minyas by Poseidon.
- Euryanassa, a surname of Hebe
