= Magnesia ad Sipylum =

Ancient Greek city in Asia Minor

- Mαγνησία ἡ πρὸς Σιπύλῳ; Mαγνησία ἡ ἐπὶ Σιπύλου (Ancient Greek)
- Location within Turkey
- 38°37′N 27°26′E
- Location: Turkey
- Region: Manisa Province

Magnesia ad Sipylum (Greek: Mαγνησία ἡ πρὸς Σιπύλῳ or Mαγνησία ἡ ἐπὶ Σιπύλου; modern Manisa, Turkey) was a city of Lydia, situated about 65 km northeast of Smyrna (now İzmir) on the river Hermus (now Gediz) at the foot of Mount Sipylus. The city should not be confused with its older neighbor, Magnesia on the Maeander, both founded by colonists from the Greek region of Magnesia.

== History ==
The first uncontested mention of the city is from the 5th century BC in the work of Hellanicus of Lesbos. The first famous event connected with the city is in 190 BC, when Antiochus the Great was defeated in the battle of Magnesia by the Roman consul Lucius Cornelius Scipio Asiaticus. It became a city of importance under Roman rule and, though nearly destroyed by an earthquake in the reign of Tiberius, was restored with financial help from that emperor and flourished through the Roman Empire. It was an important regional centre through the Byzantine Empire, and during the 13th-century interregnum of the Empire of Nicea. Magnesia housed the Imperial mint, the Imperial treasury, and served as the functional capital of the Empire until the recovery of Constantinople in 1261. The city prospered under the Laskaris and its warehouses and depots received goods from as far as Egypt and India through the Italian city-states.

In the late 13th and early 14th centuries the region of Magnesia was subject to repeated raids by invading Turkish bands. After a failed campaign in 1302 by then co-emperor Michael IX and his unsuccessful defence of the city, most inhabitants fled to the Aegean coast and the European part of the Byzantine Empire. At least 100 refugees were killed by the Turks on their way to neighbouring Pergamon. As a result of the Turkish invasion of the region, and the destruction of the city, the area became largely desolate.

== Landmarks ==
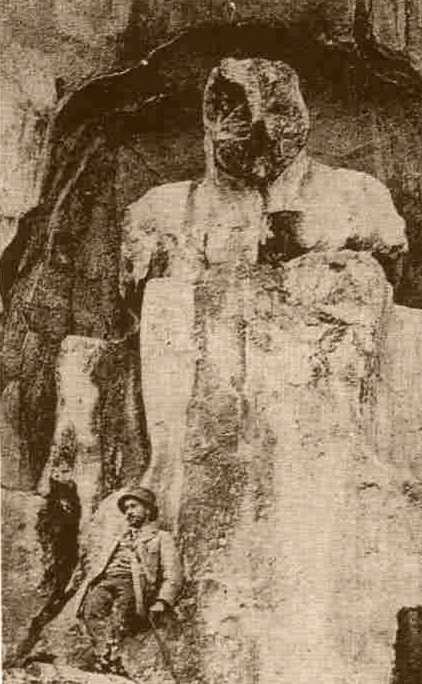
Early 20th century postcard image of the Hittite statue of the Mother Goddess Cybele in Mount Sipylus

There are two famous relics of antiquity. The first is the Niobe of Sipylus (Aglayan Kaya), a natural rock formation, on the lowest slopes of the mountains in the middle of town. The second is the Suratlu Tash, a colossal stone carving allegedly portraying Cybele, about 100 meters up the mountain about 6 km east of the town. This is a colossal seated image cut in a niche of the rock, of Hittite origin, and perhaps that called by Pausanias the very ancient statue of the Mother of the Gods, carved by Broteas, son of Tantalus, and sung by Homer. It can be seen by driving into a parking lot at a children's playground.

Near the carving lie many remains of a primitive city, and about a kilometer east is the rock-seat conjecturally identified with Pausanias's Throne of Pelops. There are also hot springs and a sacred grotto of Apollo. Parts of the major fortifications built during the Empire of Nicea remain evident.

=== Magnetism ===
One of the regions colonized by the Magnetes was a primary source for mysterious stones that could attract or repel each other, possibly leading to the modern term for magnets and magnetism. Some suggest that it was Magnesia ad Sipylum, others that it was the ancient Magnesia in Thessaly; this has been debated both in modern times and in antiquity without resolution.

== Inscriptions ==
Two funerary stelae from the Late Hellenistic period have been discovered in or near the site of ancient Magnesia ad Sipylum, and are now housed in the Manisa Museum. One stele, found in Muradiye (northwest of Manisa), is a marble pedimental slab with side acroteria; the central top piece is missing. The inscription reads: "Alkimos, son of Herakleides. Farewell!". A person of the same name and patronymic appears in a contemporary inscription from the Cayster Valley, where he is recorded as a symbolaphoros representing the village of Tauroch. A second stele, possibly also marble, was found in Manisa. The first three lines are framed within a wreath. The inscription honors "Theoxenos, son of Asklapon", stating that he was commemorated by "the people and the relatives", suggesting a joint civic and familial dedication.

In total, 38 inscriptions from Magnesia were known in 1978. The most important one is a treaty of sympoliteia arranged with Smyrna probably in 245.

== Bishopric ==
The town had a bishop in late antiquity, suffran to the bishop in Ephesus. Known bishops include:

- Eusebius, at the Council of Ephesus (431)
- Alexander, at the Council of Chalcedon (553)
- Stephen at the Council of Constantinople (680)
- Basil at the second council of Nicæa (787)
- Athanasius at Constantinople (869)
- Luke fl 879

== See also ==
- List of ancient Greek cities
