= Antigona (Accius) =

Tragedy by Lucius Accius

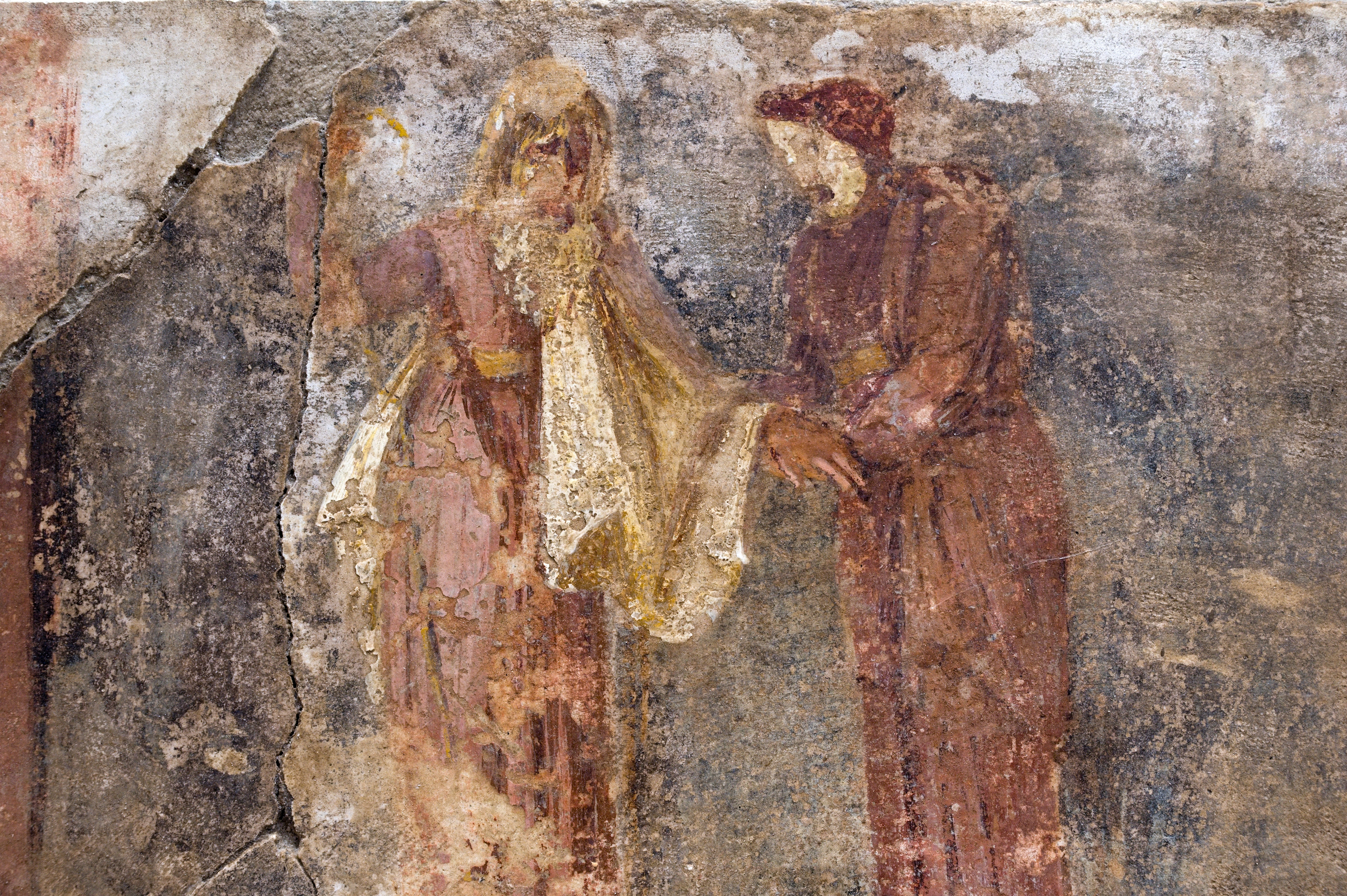
- Antigone leads a blind Oedipus, as depicted on a 1st-century BCE mural from Delos
- Author: Lucius Accius
- Language: Latin
- Subject: Myth of Antigone
- Genre: Tragedy
- Set in: Thebes
- Publication date: 2nd-century BCE
- Publication place: Rome

Antigona is a lost play by the 2nd-century Roman author Lucius Accius describing the myth of Antigone. The surviving fragments preserve a scene wherein one of the guards of Polyneices's body hears Antigone's cries as she sees his corpse and then wakes the other guards from their sleep. The subsequent judgement of Antigone before Creon following her arrest is also preserved in the play, and so is perhaps a scene wherein the Chorus asks Creon not to dismiss Teiresias. Various lines from the play evidently served as inspiration for certain passages in the Aeneid of Virgil. For example, in one line, Accius writes "Now nor do the gods hold sway, nor does the supreme ruler of the gods care for mortals" ("iam iam neque di regunt neque profecto deum supremus rex res curat hominibus"), which closely parallels a line from the Aeneid reading "now neither mighty Juno nor the Saturnian sire looks on these things with righteous eyes" ("iam iam nec maxima Iuno nec Saturnius haec oculis pater aspicit aequis"). The similarity between these two lines was already noticed by the 5th-century author Macrobius, who also notes one other parallel between the two works. Macrobius quotes a scene wherein either Ismene or Creon speaks to Antigone herself, saying "the more I understand you to be of that mindset, Antigona, the more right it is that I take thought and make allowances for you" ("Quanto magis te isti modi esse intellego, tanto, Antigona, magis me par est tibi consulere et parcere"), which resembles a scene from the Aeneid wherein Latinus describes his fear for Turnus. Some of the lines of the play appear to be translations of various passages from the Antigone of Sophocles.
