= Antigone =

Daughter of Oedipus in Greek mythology

- Princess of Thebes
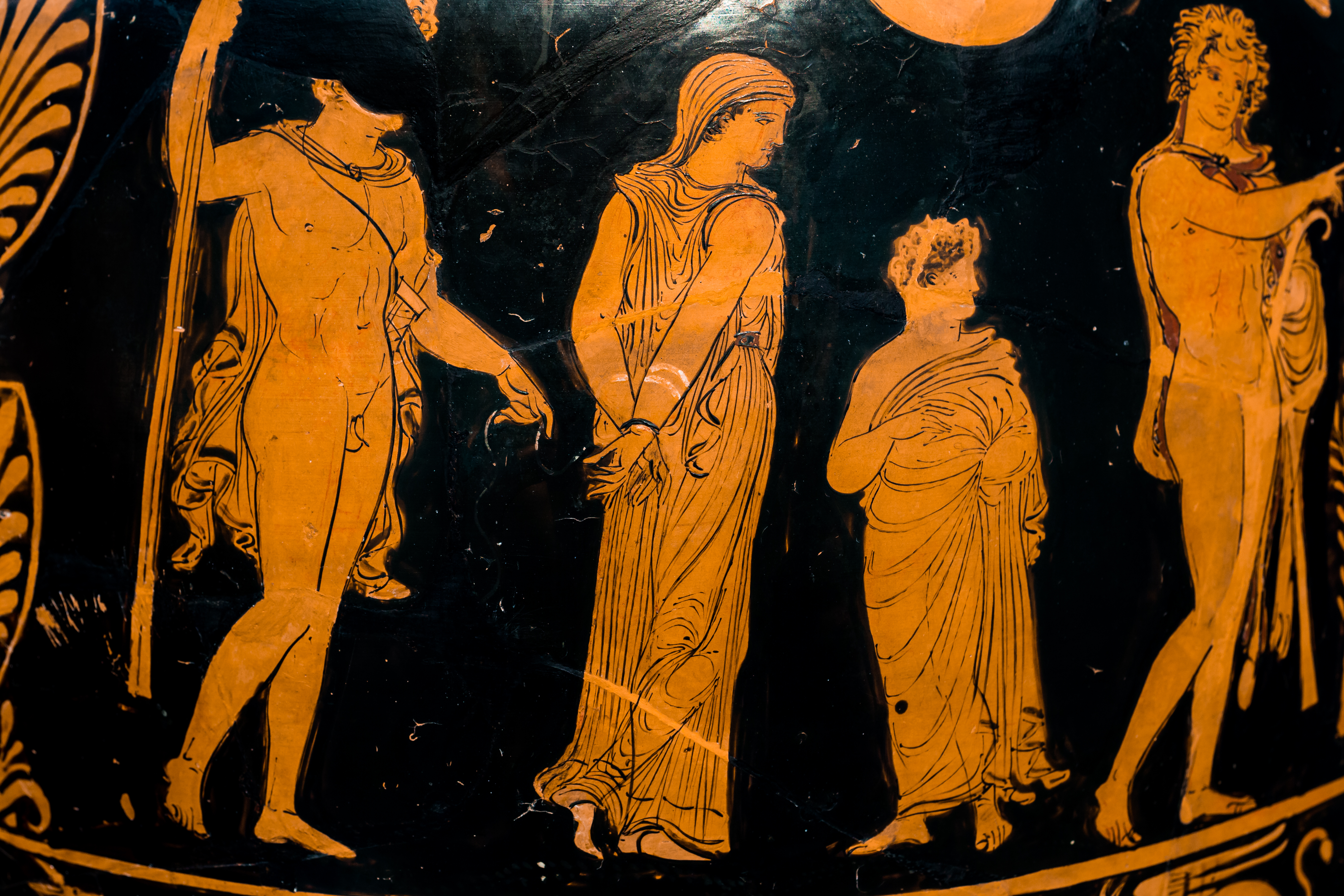
- Antigone tied on an Apulian red-figure amphora by the Darius Painter, c. 350–320 BCE, Altes Museum
- Abode: Thebes, Ancient Greece

Genealogy
- Parents: Oedipus (father); Jocasta or Euryganeia (mother)
- Siblings: Ismene; Eteocles; Polynices; Oedipus

In Greek mythology, Antigone (/ænˈtɪɡəni/ ann-TIG-ə-nee; Ancient Greek: Ἀντιγόνη, romanized: Antigónē) was a Theban princess and a character in several ancient Greek tragedies. She was the daughter of Oedipus, king of Thebes; her mother/grandmother was either Jocasta or, in another variation of the myth, Euryganeia. She was the sister of Polynices, Eteocles, and Ismene.

Antigone appears in three 5th century BC tragic plays written by Sophocles, known collectively as the three Theban plays, with her being the protagonist of the eponymous tragedy Antigone. She makes a brief appearance at the end of Aeschylus' Seven against Thebes, and her story was also the subject of Euripides' now lost play of the same name. While Antigone may not have many appearances throughout Greek Myth, Sophocles' play has led to Antigone receiving a revered and long-lasting legacy.

== In Sophocles ==
The story of Antigone was addressed by the fifth-century BC Greek playwright Sophocles in his Theban plays:

=== Oedipus Rex ===
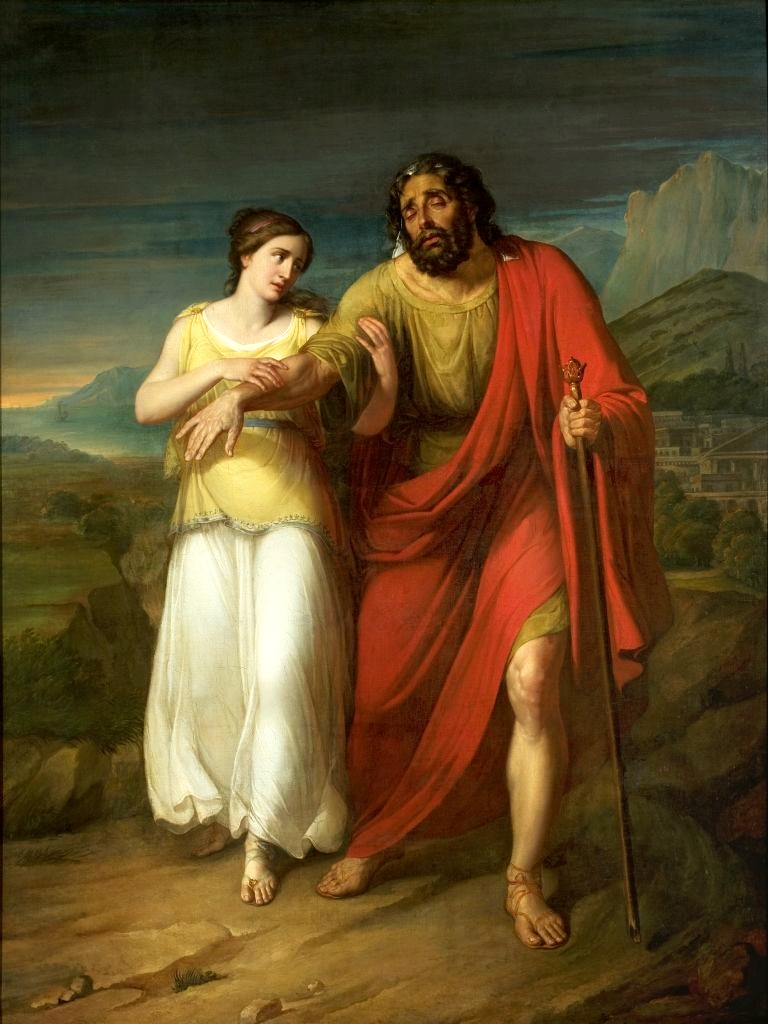
Oedipus and Antigone by Aleksander Kokular (1825–1828), National Museum, Warsaw.

Antigone and her sister Ismene are seen at the end of Oedipus Rex as Oedipus laments the "shame" and "sorrow" he is leaving his daughters to. He then begs Creon to watch over them, but in his grief reaches to take them with him as he is led away. Creon prevents him from taking the girls out of the city with him. Neither of them is named in the play.

=== Oedipus at Colonus ===
Antigone serves as her father's guide in Oedipus at Colonus, as she leads him into the city where the play takes place. Antigone resembles her father in her stubbornness and doomed existence. She stays with her father for most of the play, until she is taken away by Creon in an attempt to blackmail Oedipus into returning to Thebes. However, Theseus defends Oedipus and rescues both Antigone and her sister who was also taken prisoner.

At the end of the play, both Antigone and her sister mourn the death of their father. Theseus offers them the comfort of knowing that Oedipus has received a proper burial, but by his wishes, they cannot go to the site. Antigone then decides to return to Thebes.

=== Antigone ===
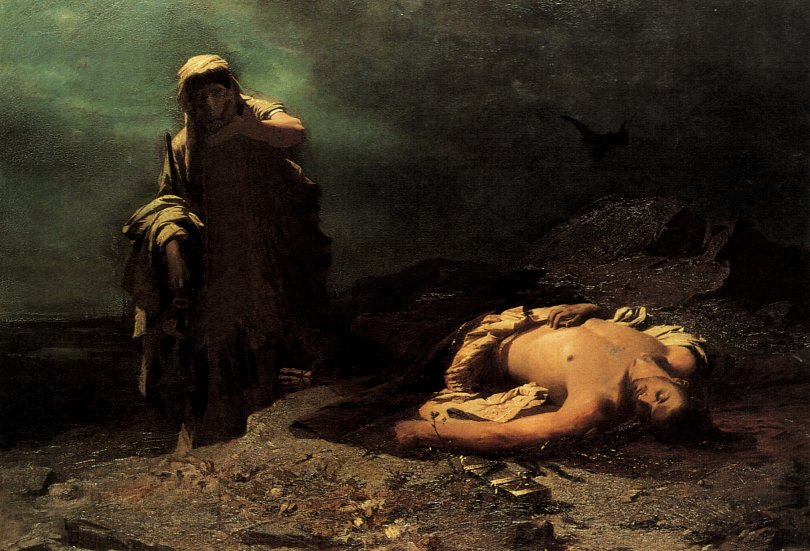
Antigone in Front of the Dead Polynices by Nikiforos Lytras, National Gallery, Athens, Greece (1865)

In her eponymous play, Antigone attempts to secure a respectable burial for her brother Polynices. Oedipus's sons, Eteocles and Polynices, had shared rule jointly until they quarreled, and Eteocles expelled his brother. In Sophocles' account, the two brothers agreed to alternate rule each year, but Eteocles decided not to share power with his brother after his tenure expired. Polynices left the kingdom, gathered an army and attacked the city of Thebes in the war of the Seven against Thebes. Both brothers were killed in the battle.

King Creon, who has ascended to the throne of Thebes after the death of the brothers, decrees that Polynices is not to be buried or even mourned, on pain of death by stoning. Antigone, Polynices' sister, defies the king's order and is caught.

Antigone is brought before Creon, confessing her crime and foreknowledge of the king’s edict that Polynices neither be buried nor mourned, claiming the superiority of divine law to human law. Antigone’s self-defense in defiance of Creon is passionate, courageous and determined. Creon orders Antigone buried alive in a tomb. Although Creon finally has a change of heart—due to a visit from soothsayer Tiresias—and tries to release Antigone, he finds she has hanged herself. Creon's son Haemon, who was engaged to Antigone, kills himself with a sword (after an unsuccessful attempt to kill Creon), and his mother Queen Eurydice also kills herself in despair over her sons’ deaths (Haemon and Megareus), which she attributes to Creon’s misrule and misjudgement. By her death Antigone ends up destroying the household of her adversary, Creon.

== Other representations ==
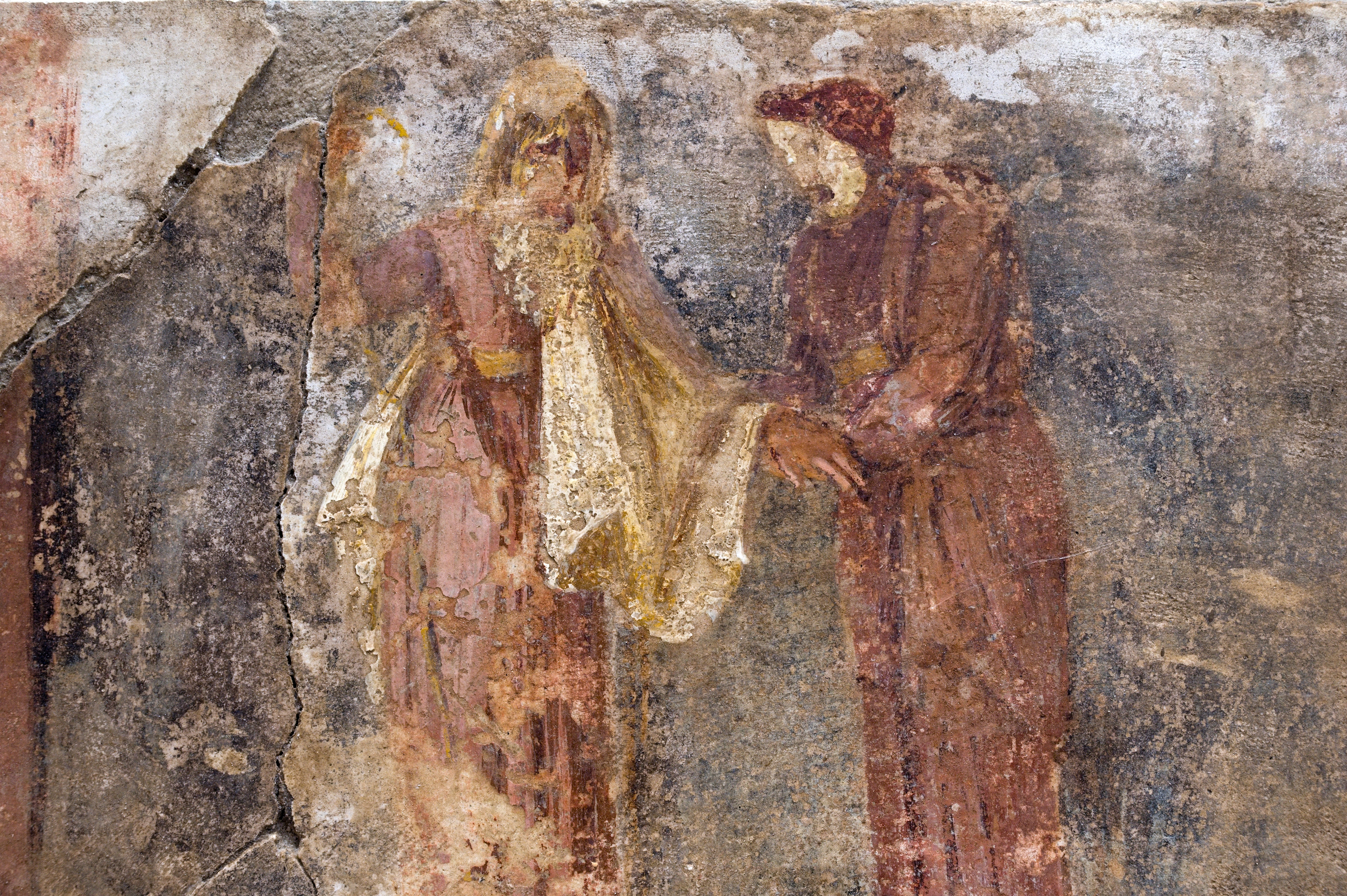
Antigone leads the blind Oedipus away on a mural from Delos, 1st century BC.

In the oldest version of the story, the burial of Polynices takes place during Oedipus' reign in Thebes, before Oedipus marries his mother, Jocasta. However, in other versions such as Sophocles' tragedies Oedipus at Colonus and Antigone, it occurs in the years after the banishment and death of Oedipus and Antigone's struggles against Creon.

=== Seven Against Thebes ===
Antigone appears briefly in Aeschylus' Seven Against Thebes. Antigone and Ismene mourn the deaths of their siblings and Antigone defies a herald's edict against the burial of Polynices.

=== Euripides's Lost Play ===
The dramatist Euripides also wrote a play called Antigone, which is lost, but some of the text was preserved by later writers and in passages in his Phoenissae. In Euripides, the calamity is averted by the intercession of Dionysus and is followed by the marriage of Antigone and Hæmon. Antigone also plays a role in the Phoenissae.

=== Appearances Elsewhere ===
Different elements of the legend appear in other places. The 4th century tragedian Astydamas wrote a play about Antigone that is now lost. A description of an ancient painting by Philostratus (Imagines ii. 29) refers to Antigone placing the body of Polynices on the funeral pyre, and this is also depicted on a sarcophagus in the Villa Doria Pamphili in Rome. And in Hyginus's version of the legend, apparently founded on a tragedy by a follower of Euripides, Antigone, on being handed over by Creon to her lover Hæmon to be slain, is secretly carried off by him and concealed in a shepherd's hut, where she bears him a son, Maeon. When the boy grows up, he attends some funeral games at Thebes, and is recognized by the mark of a dragon on his body, which only appears on dependents of the Spartoi, the first people of Thebes. This leads to the discovery that Antigone is still alive. The demi-god Heracles then intercedes and unsuccessfully pleads with Creon to forgive Hæmon. Hæmon then kills Antigone and himself. The intercession by Heracles is also represented on a painted vase (circa 380–300 BC). References to Antigone can also be found in Seneca's Phoenissae and in Statius's Thebais.

== Genealogy ==
Cadmus	Pentheus
Polydorus	Oclasus
Labdacus	Menoeceus
Laios	Jocasta
Oedipus	Jocasta
Eteocles	Polynices	Ismene	Antigone

== Gallery ==
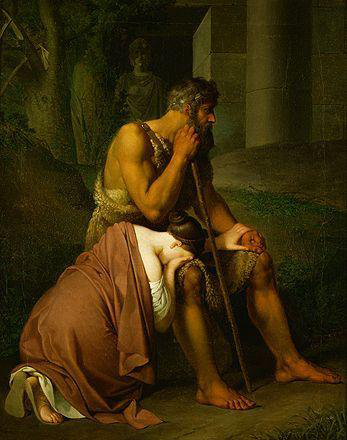
Oedipe et Antigone by Johann Peter Krafft, 1809

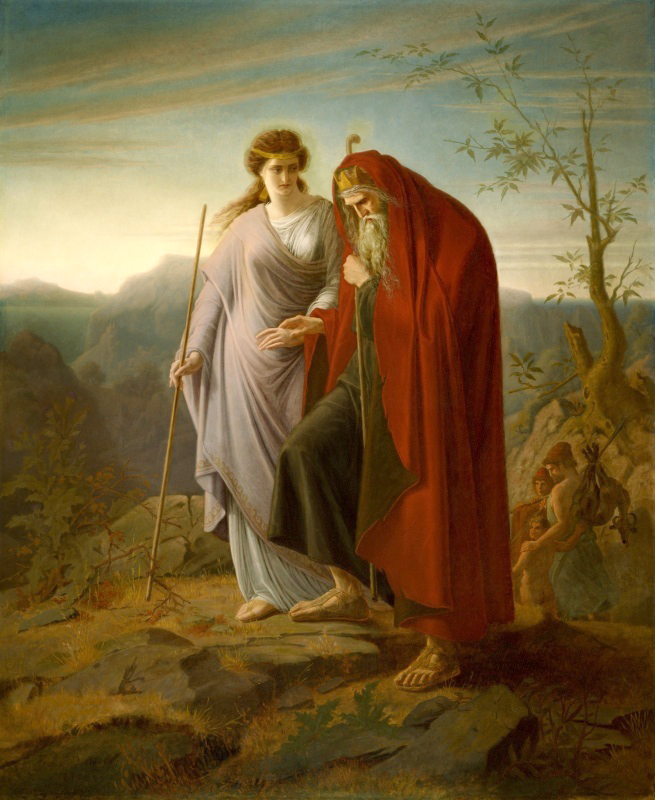
Oedipus and Antigon by Franz Dietrich

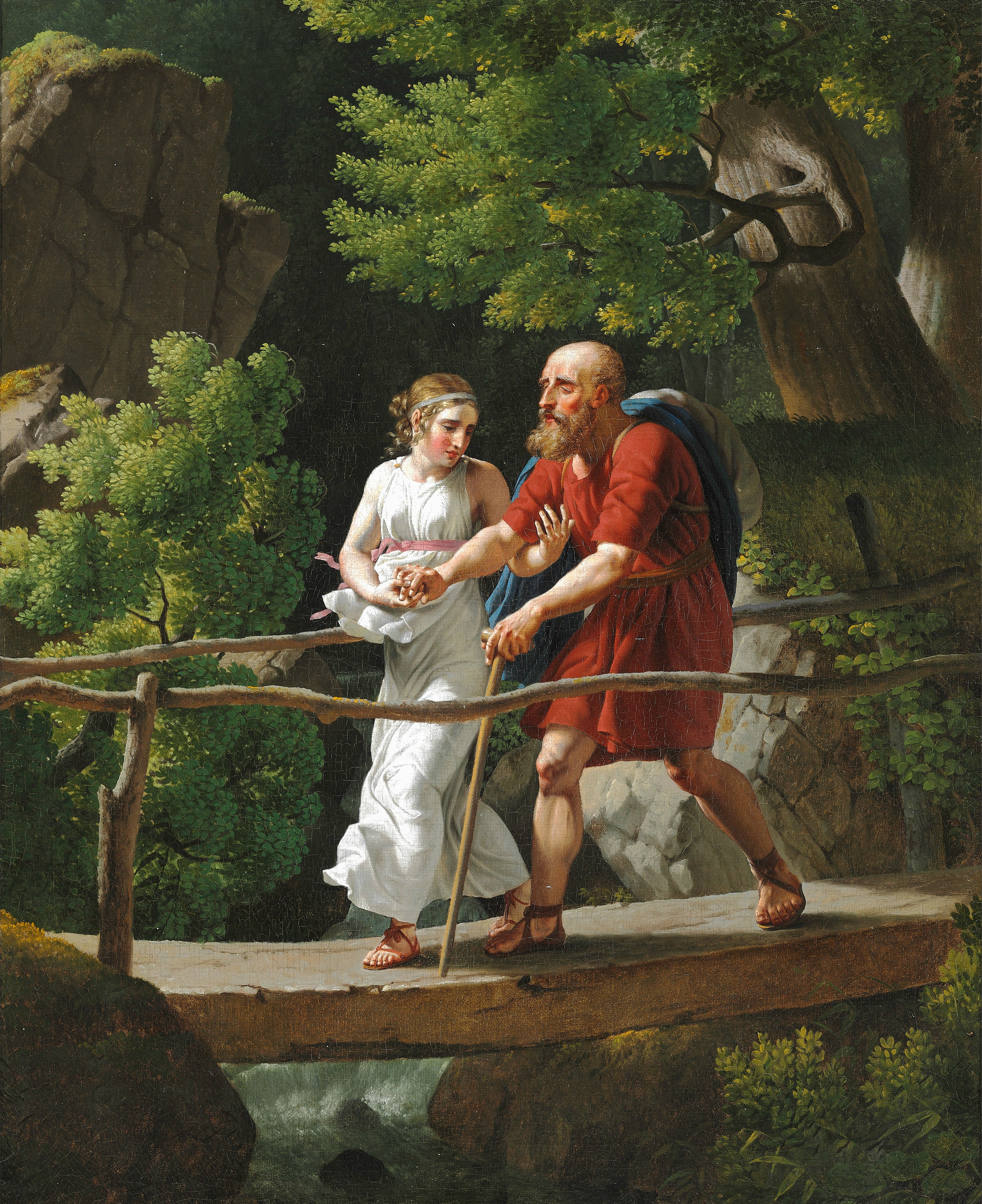
Oedipus and Antigone by C. W. Eckersberg (1812)

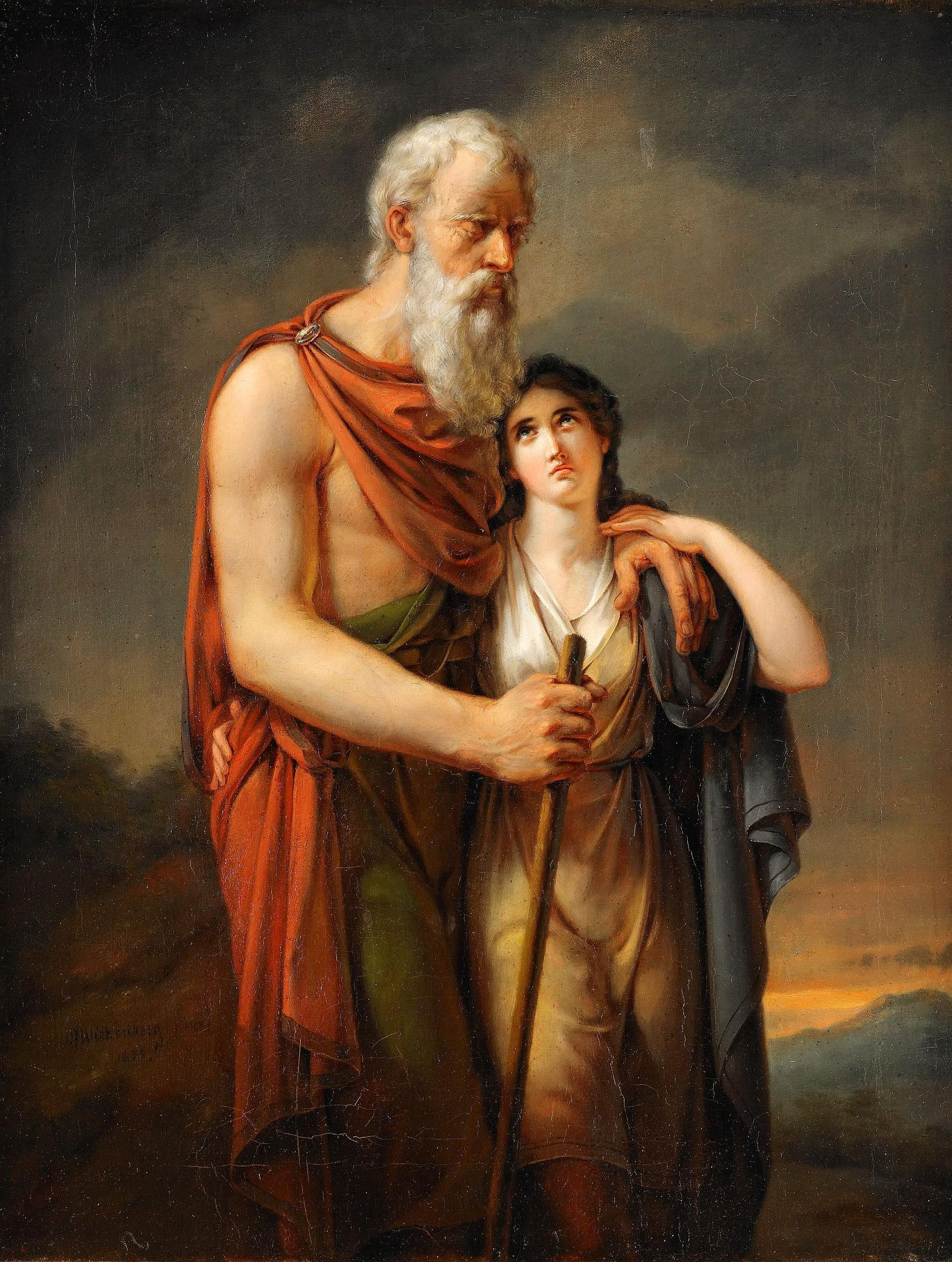
Oedipus and Antigone by Per Wickenberg (1833)

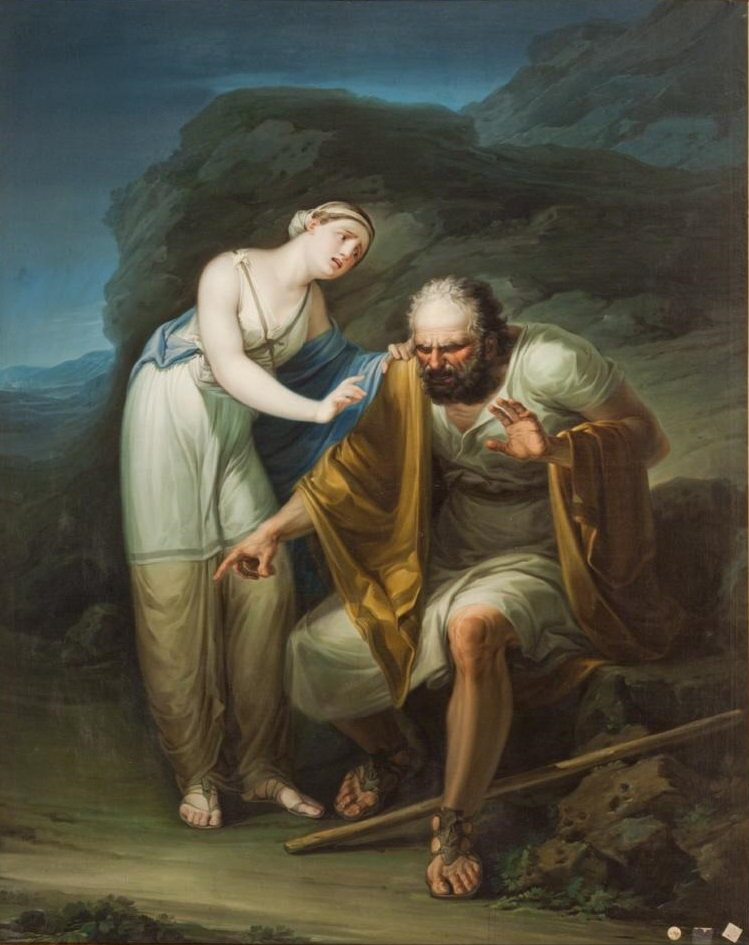
Edipo y Antigona by José Ribelles (circa 1800)

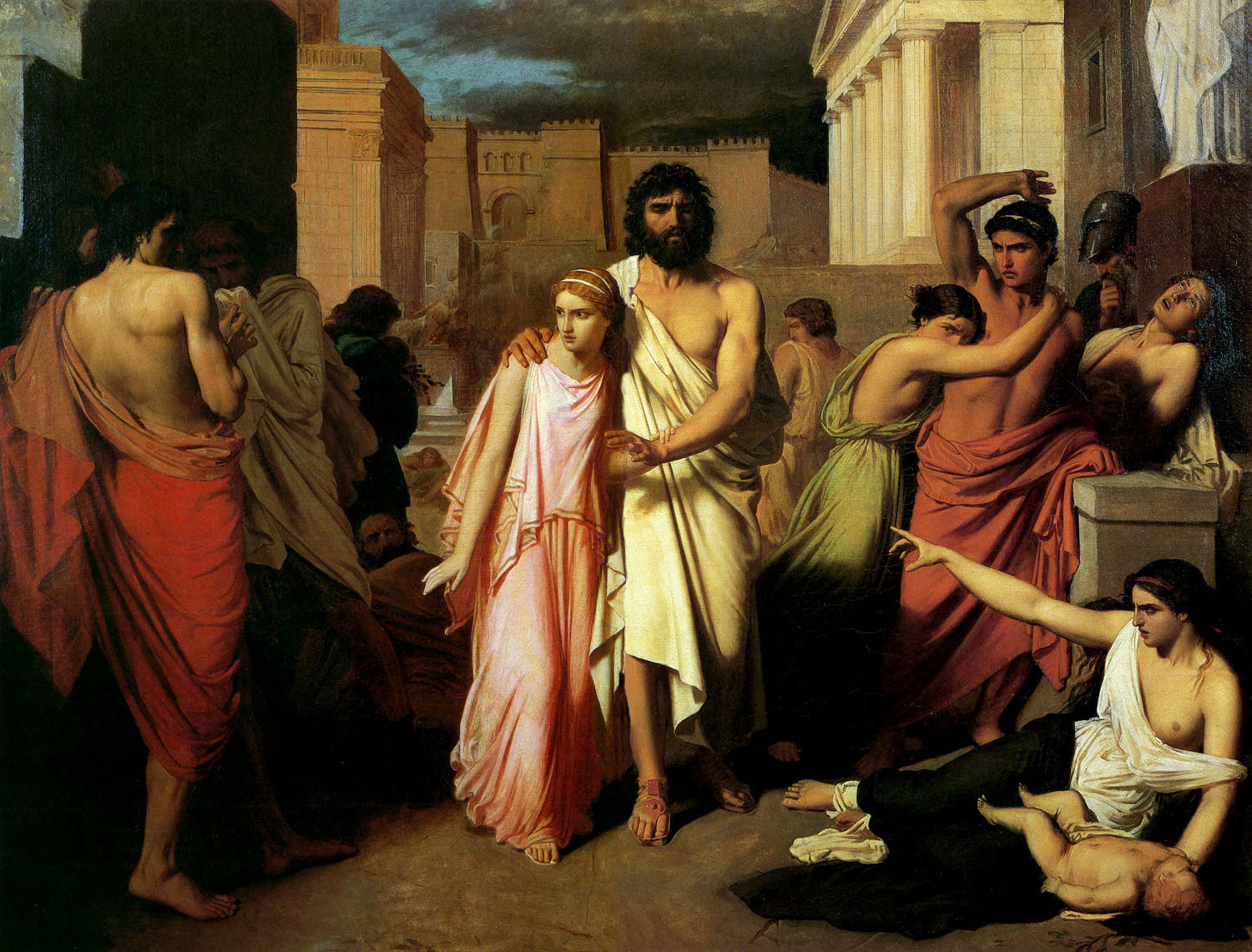
Oedipus and Antigone by Charles Jalabert (1842)

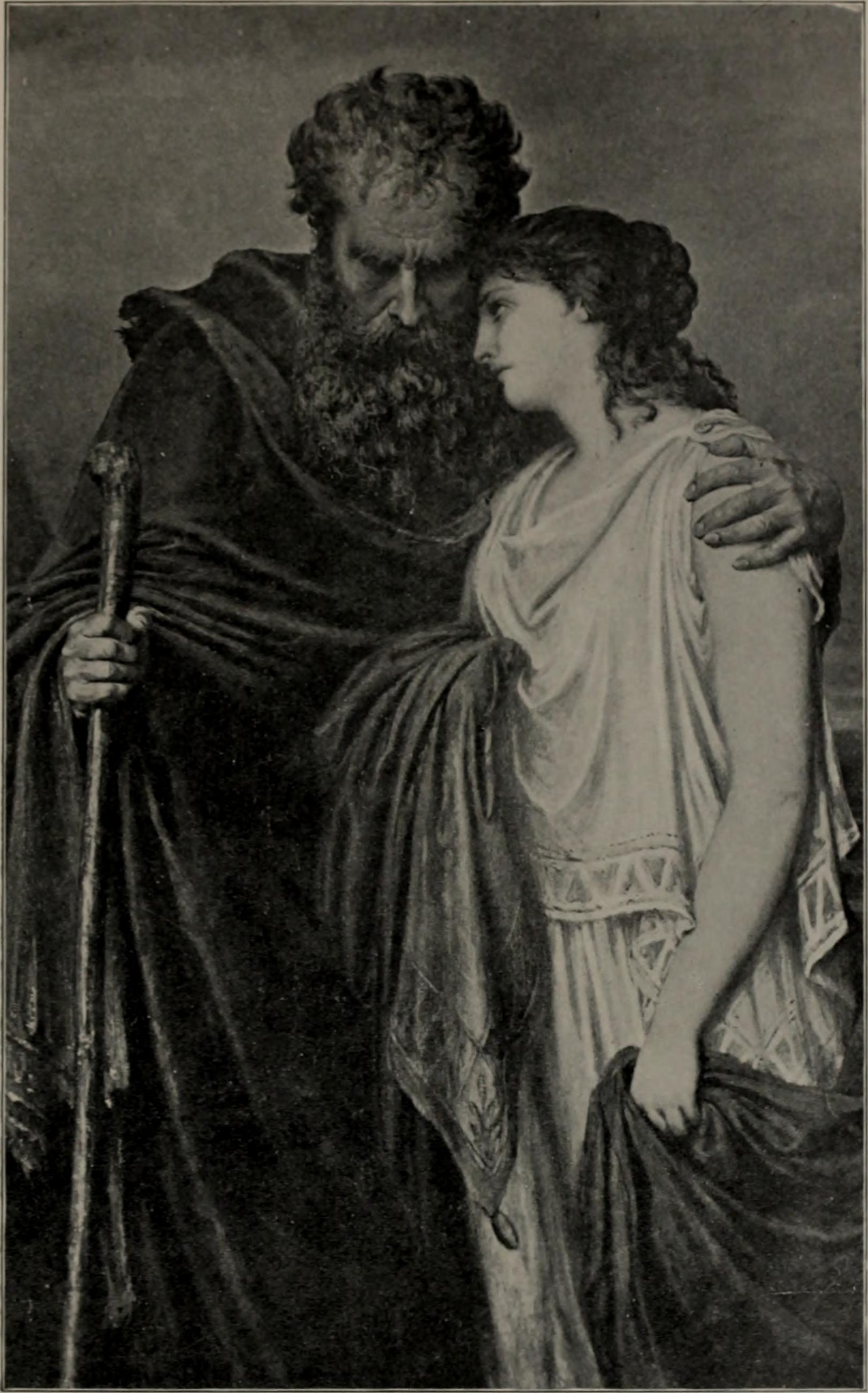
Oedipus and Antigon

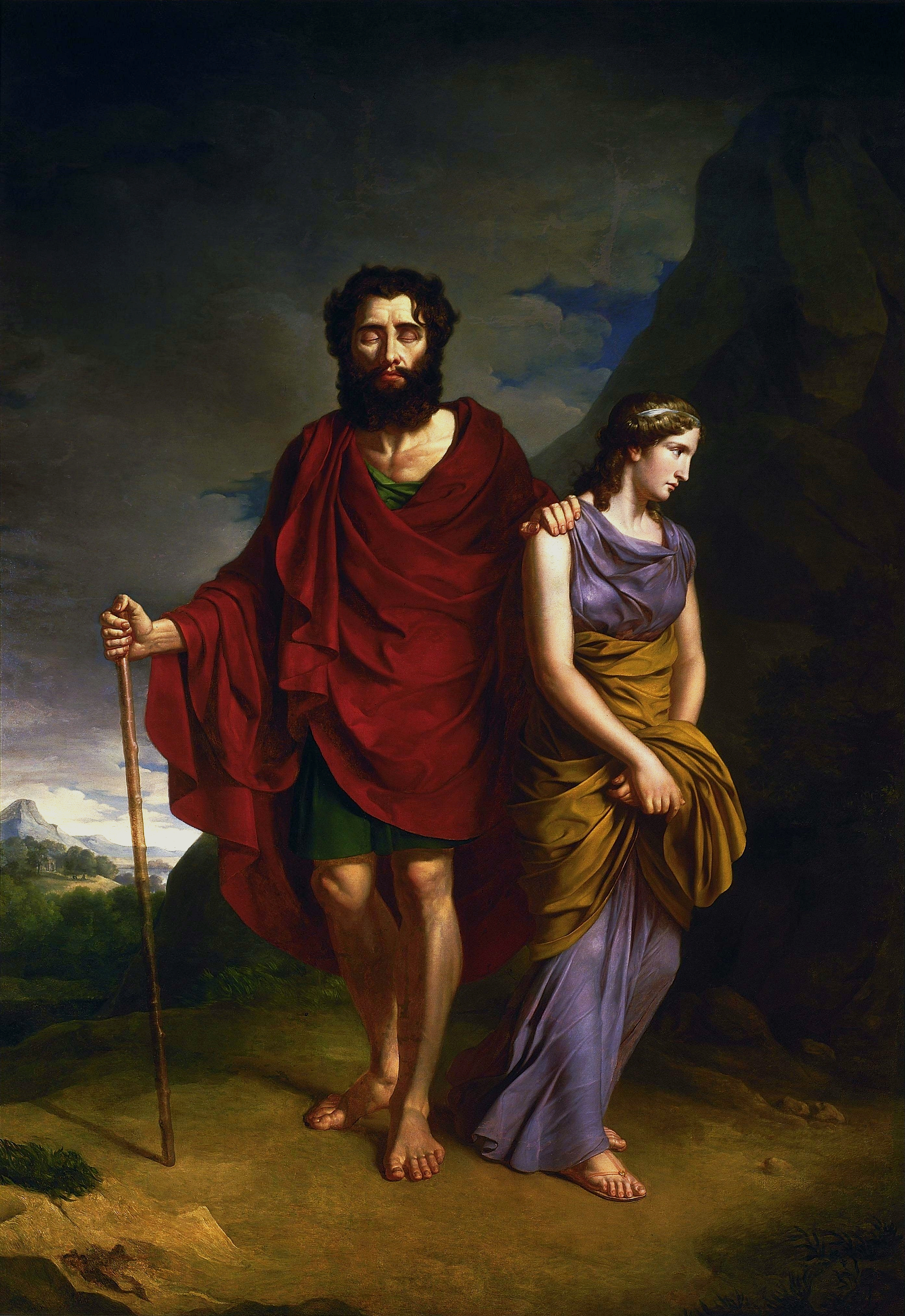
Oedipus and Antigon by Antoni Brodowski (1828)

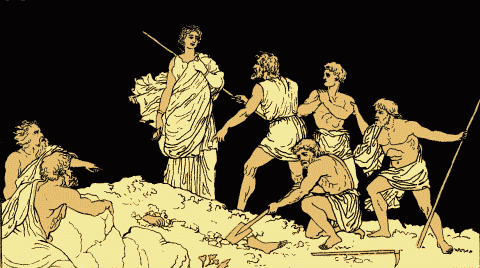
Antigone and the body of Polynices (Project Gutenberg)

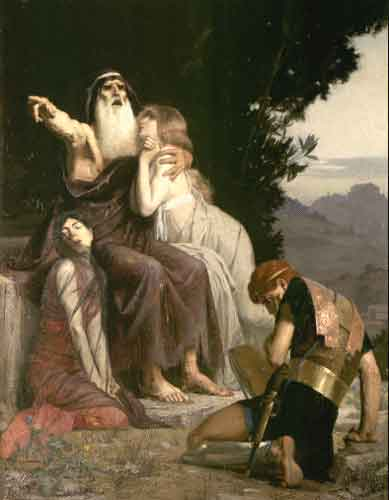
Ödipus (mit Ismene und Antigone) verurteilt Polyneikes by Marcel Baschet (1883)

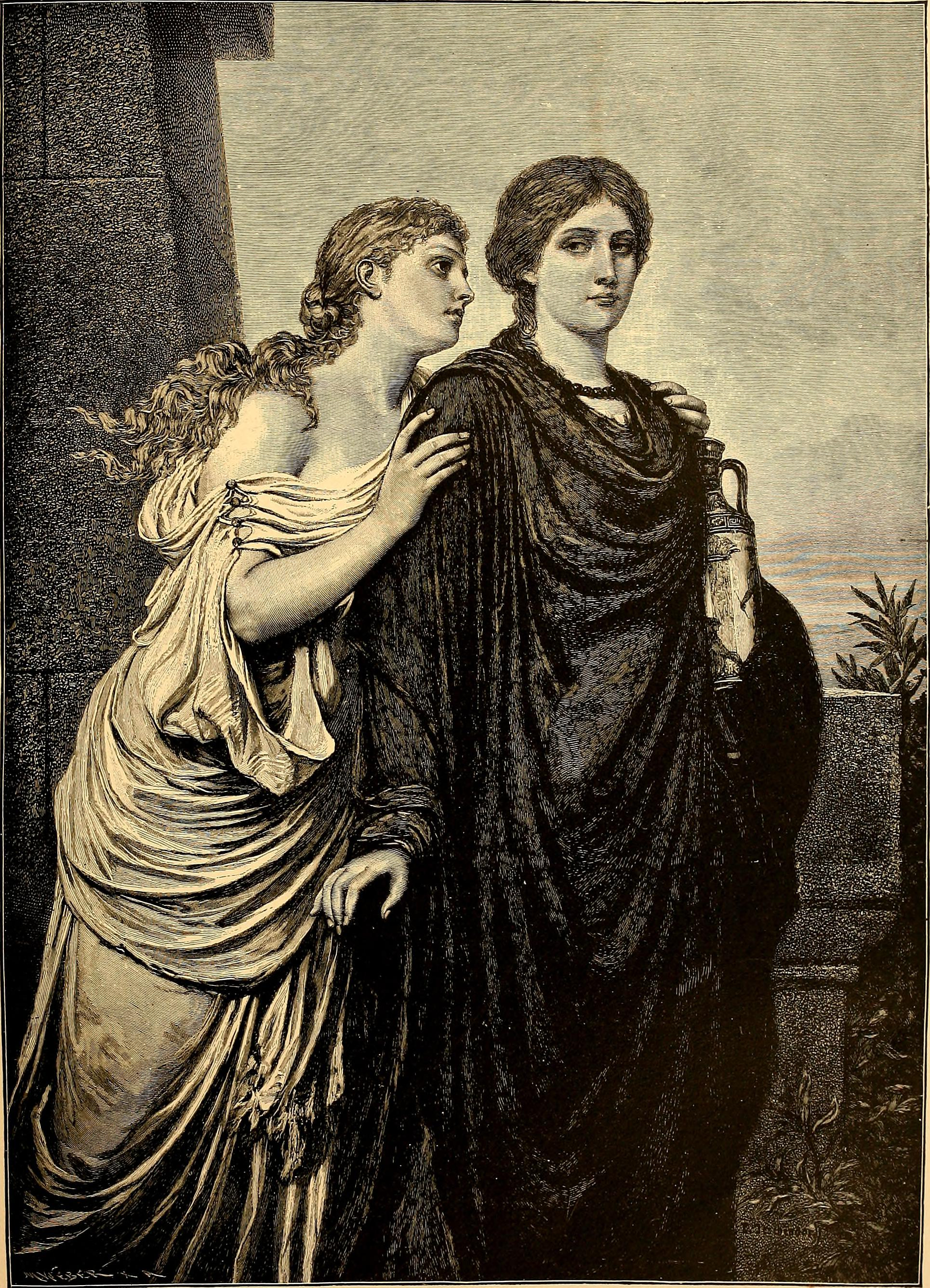
Antigone and Ismene

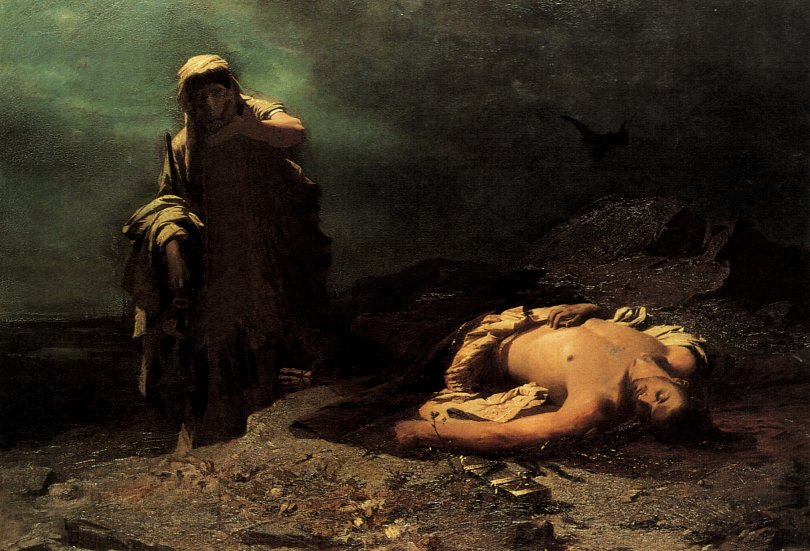
Antigone in front of the dead Polynices by Nikiforos Lytras (1865)

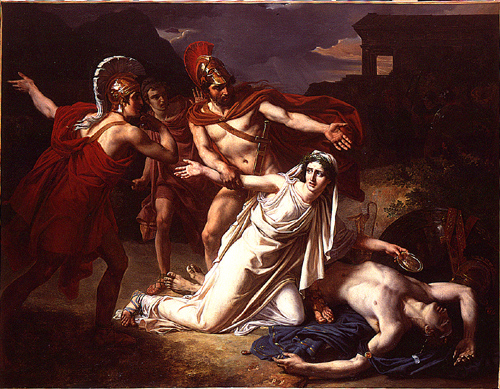
Antigone donnant la sépulture à Polynice by Sébastien Norblin (1825)

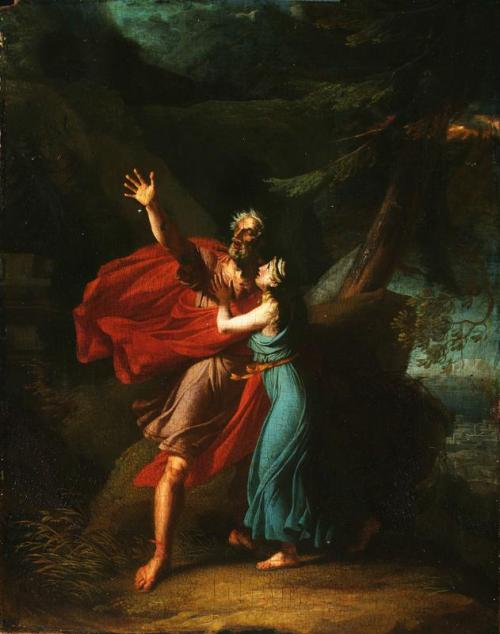
Oedipus and Antigone by Charles Thévenin, Aberdeen Archives, Gallery & Museums Collection

== Cultural references ==
In modern times, Antigone is invoked as a symbol of heroism.

=== Adaptations ===
The story of Antigone has been a popular subject for books, plays, and other works, including:

- Antigone, one of the three extant Theban plays by Sophocles (497 BC – 406 BC), the most famous adaptation
- Antigone, a play by Euripides (c. 480 – 406 BC) which is now lost except for some fragments
- Antigona, a play by Lucius Accius.
- Antigone (1631), a play by Thomas May
- Antigona, opera by Tommaso Traetta, libretto by Marco Coltellini (1772)
- Antigona, opera by Josef Mysliveček, libretto by Gaetano Roccaforte (1774)
- Antigone (1841), settings of the choruses by Felix Mendelssohn as incidental music for a performance of Johann Jakob Christian Donner's translation of Sophocles
- Antigone, opera by Arthur Honegger (1892–1955), libretto by Jean Cocteau (1889–1963)
- Antigonae (Salzburg 1949), opera by Carl Orff (1895–1982)
- Antigone (1944), French adaptation of Sophocles's play by Jean Anouilh (1910–1987) performed during the Nazi occupation of Paris
- "Antigone-Legend", for soprano and piano (text by Bertolt Brecht), by Frederic Rzewski (1938–2021) and presented as a play in two slightly different versions in 1948 and 1951
- Αντιγόνη (Antigone), ballet by Mikis Theodorakis (b. 1925), 1959
- Αντιγόνη (Antigone), opera by Mikis Theodorakis (b. 1925), 1995–96
- Antigone (1990/1991), opera by Ton de Leeuw (b. 1926)
- Another Antigone, play by A. R. Gurney (b. 1930)
- Antigone (1961), a film directed by Yorgos Javellas, starring Irene Papas
- The Burial at Thebes (2004), by Seamus Heaney, adapted into a 2008 opera with music by Dominique Le Gendre
- Antígona Vélez (1950), adaptation of Sophocles' play by Argentine writer Leopoldo Marechal (1900–1970)
- Antigona (1960), a play by Dominik Smole
- Antigone (1948), by Bertolt Brecht, based on the translation by Friedrich Hölderlin and published under the title Antigonemodell 1948 An English translation of Brecht's version of the play is available
- Antigòn (1953) Haitian Creole adaptation of Sophocles' play by Haitian writer Félix Morisseau-Leroy (1912–1998)
- Antigone (2019), a film by Sophie Deraspe
- Antigone (This Play I Read in High School) by Anna Ziegler, a play that premiered at The Public Theater in 2026

=== Analysis ===
In the works of Hegel, in particular in his discussion of Sittlichkeit in his Phenomenology of Spirit and his Elements of the Philosophy of Right, Antigone is figured as exposing a tragic rift between the so-called feminine "Divine Law," which Antigone represents, and the "Human Law," represented by Creon. The Catholic philosopher Jacques Maritain considers Antigone as the "heroine of the natural law:"

she was aware of the fact that, in transgressing the human law and being crushed by it, she was obeying a higher commandment—that she was obeying laws that were unwritten, and that had their origin neither today nor yesterday, but which live always and forever, and no one knows where they have come from.

The psychoanalyst Jacques Lacan writes about the ethical dimension of Antigone in his Seminar VII, The Ethics of Psychoanalysis. Others who have written on Antigone include theorist Judith Butler, in their book Antigone's Claim, as well as philosopher Slavoj Žižek, in various works, including Interrogating the Real (Bloomsbury: London, 2005) and The Metastases of Enjoyment (Verso: London, 1994).

=== Contemporary productions ===
A new translation of Antigone into English by the Canadian poet Anne Carson has been used in a production of the play (March 2015) at the Barbican directed by Ivo van Hove and featuring Juliette Binoche as Antigone. This production was broadcast as a TV movie on April 26, 2015. The play was transferred to the BAM Harvey Theatre at the Brooklyn Academy of Music, running from September 24 to October 4, 2015.
