= Antigone (Euripides play) =

Lost tragedy by Euripides

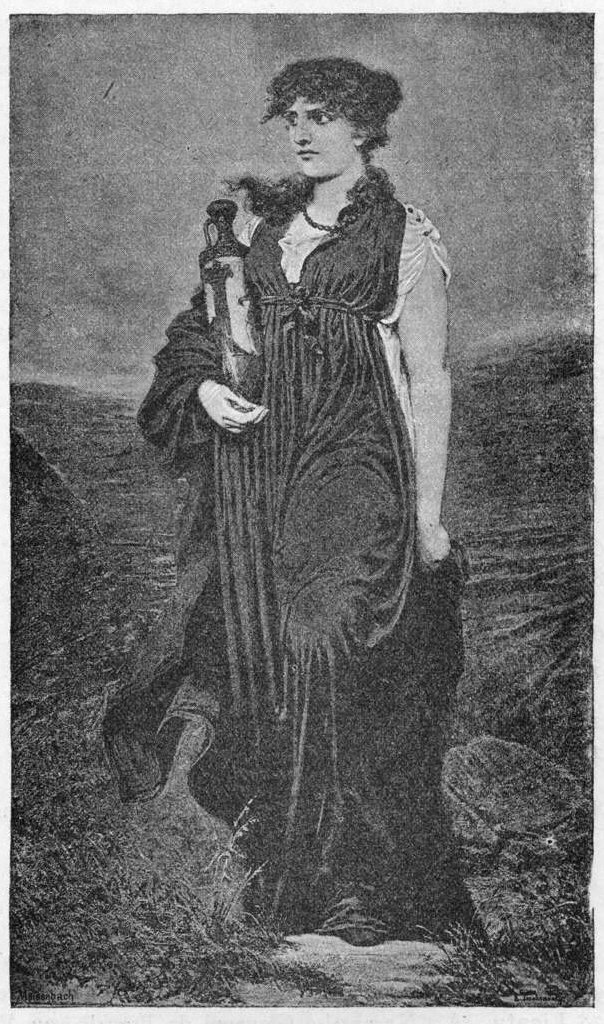
- Artistic depiction of Antigone by Emil Teschendorff, by 1883
- Written by: Euripides
- Characters: Antigone; Haemon; Creon; Others
- Original language: Ancient Greek
- Genre: Tragedy
- Setting: Thebes

Premiere
- Date premiered: Estimated between 420 and 406 BCE
- Place premiered: Athens

Antigone (/ænˈtɪɡəni/ ann-TIG-ə-nee; Ἀντιγόνη) is a play by the Attic dramatist Euripides, which is now lost except for a number of fragments. According to Aristophanes of Byzantium, the plot was similar to that of Sophocles' play Antigone, with three differences. The date of the play is uncertain, but there is evidence that it was written late in Euripides' career, between 420 BCE and 406 BCE.

== Plot ==
Sophocles' Antigone (c. 441 BCE) told the story of how Oedipus' daughter Antigone buried the body of her brother Polynices who had led an invasion of Thebes, defying the order of her uncle Creon who was ruling Thebes. As a result, Creon condemned her to death, and although Creon rescinded the death sentence, Antigone and her lover Haemon, Creon's son, killed themselves.

The extant fragments of Euripides' Antigone do not reveal much of the plot, but Aristophanes of Byzantium has written that Euripides' play differed from Sophocles' in three major ways:

1. Haemon was discovered with Antigone at the burial of Polynices
2. Haemon and Antigone married
3. Haemon and Antigone had a son Maeon

Modern scholars interpret Aristophanes comment to indicate that Euripides' play developed along similar lines to Sophocles', except that Haemon's participation in, or at least knowledge of, Antigone's burial of Polynices led to the happy resolution of their marriage in Euripides' play instead of their deaths in Sophocles' play. One extant fragment is a plea to the god Dionysus, suggesting the possibility that Dionysus was the deus ex machina who saved Antigone and Haemon and prophesied the birth of Maeon. Several extant fragments deal with love and marriage, and John Homer Huddilston believed that this, and hint from other fragments (although some of these are now believed to be from plays other than Antigone) indicate that Antigone and Haemon were married secretly.

There are two vase paintings showing scenes from an Antigone play which were historically attributed to Euripides' play, although modern scholars generally believe that they depict scenes from an Antigone play by 4th century Attic dramatist Astydamas the Younger. However, the possibility that the vases depict scenes from Euripides has not been definitively closed and even if they depict scenes from Astydamas' play they may be relevant since Astydamas may have been influenced by Euripides. The vases suggest that Heracles was the deus ex machina who saved Antigone and Haemon.

A fable by Gaius Julius Hyginus is consistent with these vase paintings and was historically attributed to Euripides' play, but modern scholars believe that this too relates to Astydamas' play rather than Euripides'. Per Hyginus, Creon had delegated the task of executing Antigone to his son Haemon, not knowing that they were secretly betrothed. Haemon deceived Creon and spared Antigone, who later bore Haemon a son. The son came to Thebes as an adult, and Creon recognized him, realizing Haemon's deception. Creon refused Heracles' request to pardon Haemon, who then killed Antigone and himself.

Huddilston, believing the vases and Hyginus fable to relate to Euripides' play, reconstructed the plot as follows. Maeon is already grown and has come to Thebes to participate in games. Creon recognizes him and is enraged that Haemon deceived him years earlier. He orders Antigone to appear before him, and she does so along with Haemon. Creon sentences one or both to death, when Heracles appears to intercede as a deus ex machina. In this reconstruction, the comment by Aristophanes of Byzantium does not apply to the plot of Euripides' play, but only to the background to the play.

== Date ==
The date for Antigone has not been definitively established. However, metrical analysis on the extant fragments, particularly the incidence of resolutions, by Cropp and Fick indicates that the play was likely written in the latter part of Euripides' life, between 420 BCE and 406 BCE. In addition, a scholiast remark indicates that another play of Euripides, Antiope, was produced after 412. However, metrical analysis of the extant fragments of Antiope indicate a much earlier date. This leaves open the possibility that the scholium erroneously referred to Antiope but meant Antigone, or originally named Antigone but this became corrupted over time. If so, that would indicate that Antigone was produced between 411 and 406 BCE.

Zimmerman has suggested that the likely theme of the play involving Polynices as a traitor who was denied burial mirrored events of the Peloponnesian War in 411 BCE, which may be a further clue to the date of Antigone.

== Notable fragments ==
Two lines from the prologue survive because Aristophanes held them up to ridicule in The Frogs. These lines talk about Oedipus starting out as a fortunate man, then becoming wretched.
