= Cinaethon of Sparta =

Ancient Greek writer

Cinaethon of Sparta (Greek: Κιναίθων ὁ Λακεδαιμόνιος Kinaithon ho Lakedaimonios) was a legendary Greek poet to whom different sources ascribe the lost epics Oedipodea, Little Iliad and Telegony. Eusebius says that he flourished in 764–3 BC. Cinaethon's poetry is preserved only in fragments, primarily preserved by Pausanias. The surviving fragments of Cinaethon are from a genealogical poem, and are not attributable to any of the poems he was said to have written.

== Select editions and translations ==
=== Critical editions ===
- Kinkel, Gottfried (1877). Epicorum Graecorum fragmenta. Vol. I. Leipzig: B. G. Teubner Verlag.
- Allen, Thomas W. (1993) [1912]. Homeri opera. Tomus V: Hymni, Cyclus, Fragmenta, Margites, Batrachomyomachia, Vitae. Oxford University Press. ISBN 0-19-814534-9.
- Bernabé, Alberto (1988). Poetae epici Graecae. Vol. I. Leipzig: Walter de Gruyter. ISBN 978-3-598-71706-2.
- Davies, Malcolm (1988). Epicorum Graecorum fragmenta. Göttingen: Vandenhoeck & Ruprecht. ISBN 978-3-525-25747-0.

=== Translations ===
- Evelyn-White, Hugh G. (1936) [1914]. Hesiod, the Homeric Hymns, and Homerica. Loeb Classical Library (3rd rev. ed.). Cambridge, Massachusetts: Harvard University Press. ISBN 978-0-674-99063-0.. (The link is to the 1st edition of 1914.) English translation with facing Greek text; now obsolete except for its translations of the ancient quotations.
- West, Martin L. (2003). Greek Epic Fragments. Loeb Classical Library. Cambridge, Massachusetts: Harvard University Press. ISBN 978-0-674-99605-2.. Greek text with facing English translation.
