= Sabuncubeli Tunnel =

Road tunnel located on Mount Sipylus

Sabuncubeli Tunnel Sabuncubeli Tüneli
- Interactive map of Sabuncubeli Tunnel; Sabuncubeli Tüneli

Overview
- Location: Karakoca, Manisa, Manisa Province – Beşyol, Bornova, İzmir Province
- Coordinates: 38°32′43″N 27°18′06″E
- Status: Operational
- Route: D.565 E881

Operation
- Work began: September 9, 2011
- Constructed: Koçoğlu and Makimsan Consortium
- Opened: 11 June 2018; 8 years ago
- Owner: General Directorate of Highways
- Operator: General Directorate of Highways
- Traffic: automotive
- Character: Twin-tube highway tunnel
- Toll: Free

Technical
- Length: 4,085 m (13,402 ft) and 4,065 m (13,337 ft)
- No. of lanes: 2 × 2
- Operating speed: 80 km/h
- Grade: 1.5%

Location of Sabuncubeli Tunnel in Turkey

The Sabuncubeli Tunnel (Turkish: Sabuncubeli Tüneli) is a road tunnel located on the Mount Sipylus (Turkish: Spil Dağı) in Aegean Region as part of the Manisa–İzmir highway D.565 E881 in Turkey.

Situated near Karakoca village in the northeast and Beşyol village of Bornova district in the southwest on the province border of Manisa and İzmir, the twin-tube tunnel is 4,070 m (13,350 ft) long carrying two lanes of traffic in each direction. In 2011, the Manisa–İzmir route had a daily traffic rate of 30,000 vehicles. The tunnel is being built to bypass the steep and twisty route at Sabuncubeli Pass, reducing the grade of highway from 7–8% to 1.5%. When completed, it will shorten the travel time between Manisa and İzmir from 45 minutes to 15 minutes, and will contribute to elimination of traffic congestion in the winter time.

The contract for the building of the tunnel was awarded to Koçoğlu and Makimsan Consortium on the build-operate-transfer basis, and was signed on August 18, 2011. It was projected that the 2,800 m (9,200 ft)-long tunnel was to be finished within three years costing ₺110 million. The groundbreaking ceremony took place in presence of Minister of Transport, Maritime and Communication Binali Yıldırım on September 9, 2011. The construction works were suspended for seven months right after the groundbreaking in order to undertake a revision in the tunnel project. The new project featured the extension of the tunnel length from initially planned 2.8 km (1.7 mi) to 4,070 m (13,350 ft), and a lesser road grade than of previously designed. The tunnel runs in average 150 m (490 ft) underground with a maximum depth of 250 m (820 ft). Excavation works continue at a daily rate of 1.5 m (4.9 ft) with a total of 150 personnel. The estimated cost was revised to ₺150 million.

A landslide, which occurred in the western tube on the northeast portal during the excavation works in 2013, caused the lengthening of the tunnel to now 6,480 m (21,260 ft), and hence a delay in the construction's completion. The tunnel opening is postponed from 2015 to end 2016 but it did not open.

The constructing company had the concession to operate the tunnel for a time span of 11 years 11 months and 11 days after its opening, and to collect the Turkish lira equivalent of US$2.50 as toll but it went bankrupt. The tunnel opened on 11 June 2018. Turkish Prime Minister Binali Yıldırım was the first one who drove in the tunnel.

== Criticism ==
Hasan Sözbilir, a professor at Dokuz Eylül University and member of the İzmir Branch of the Chamber of Engineering Geology, warned at a press conference in December 2012 that the Sabuncubeli Tunnel is situated entirely on one of the fault zones in the region. He added that structural measures have to be taken to prevent any damage in case of an earthquake.
