= Lucius Accius =

Roman poet and literary scholar (170–c.86 BC)

- Born: c.. 170 BC; Pisaurum
- Died: c.. 86 BC

Lucius Accius (/ˈæksiəs/; c..170 – c..86 BC), or Lucius Attius, was a Roman tragic poet and literary scholar. Accius was born in 170 BC at Pisaurum, a town founded in the Ager Gallicus in 184 BC. He was the son of a freedman and a freedwoman, probably from Rome.

The year of his death is unknown, but he must have lived to a great age, since Cicero (born 106 BC, hence 64 years younger) reports having conversed with him on literary matters.

== Literary works ==
Accius was a prolific writer and enjoyed a very high reputation. The titles and considerable fragments (about 700 lines) of some fifty plays have been preserved. Judging from the titles and fragments, scholars have surmised that most, if not all, of these poems were tragic in nature, although Pliny the Younger ranks him among the erotic poets. His career as a poet can be traced over the course of 36 years from B.C. 140, to B.C. 104.

Most of his poetical works were imitations or free translations of the Greek, especially Aeschylus. The earliest of these was most likely the Atreus, which was performed in 140, but is now lost. He also wrote on some Roman subjects, one of which, an examination of the tyranny of L. Tarquinius Superbus and his expulsion by Lucius Junius Brutus, was titled Brutus, and was probably written in honor of his patron D. Brutus. His favorite subjects were the legends of the Trojan War and the house of Pelops. While only fragments remain, the most important of which were preserved by Cicero, they seem sufficient to justify the terms of admiration in which Accius is spoken of by the ancient writers. He is particularly praised for the strength and vigor of his language, and the sublimity of his thoughts. Although the grandiloquence of his literary style was on occasion mocked by some of his peers, he continued to be cited by other writers long after his death.

Accius wrote other works of a literary character: Libri Didascalicon, a treatise in verse on the history of Greek and Roman poetry, and dramatic art in particular; also Libri Pragmaticon, Parerga, and Praxidica, of which no fragments remain; and a hexameter Annales containing the history of Rome, like that of Ennius.

== As a grammarian ==
Accius also attempted to introduce innovations in Latin orthography and grammar, most of which were attempts to change written Latin to more faithfully reproduce its actual pronunciation. Few of these caught on, although his preference against giving Greek names Latin endings had quite a few supporters, particularly Varro, who dedicated his De antiquitate litterarum to Accius.

A spelling convention of writing long vowels double (such as aa for long ā) is also associated with him and is found in texts concurrent with his lifetime.

== Politics and temperament ==
Accius was politically conservative and generally noted for his dignity and reserve. He did, however, believe that one with literary gifts, such as himself, ought to be accorded more respect than someone who, through no effort of their own, was merely born into the nobility. He was, by some accounts, a self-important man, and some writers expressed a wry amusement at the larger-than-life statues of himself that he had erected in the temple of the Muses.

A fragment of Accius' play Atreus features the line oderint dum metuant ("let them hate, so long as they fear").

== List of known works ==
- Achilles
- Aegisthus
- Aeneade or Decius ("Sons of Aeneas" or "Decius")
- Alcestis
- Alcmeo ("Alcmaeon")
- Alphesiboea
- Amphitryo ("Amphitryon")
- Andromeda
- Annales ("Annals")
- Antenoridae ("Antenor's Sons")
- Antigona ("Antigone")
- Armorum Iudicium ("Award of the Arms")
- Astynanax
- Athamas
- Atreus
- Bacchae ("The Bacchanals")
- Brutus
- Chrysippus
- Clytaemnestra
- Didascalia or Didascalion Libri ("Records of the Stage" or "Books of Stage Records")
- Diomedes
- Epigoni ("The After-Born")
- Epinausmache ("The Battle at the Ships")
- Erigona
- Eriphyla ("Eriphyle")
- Eurysaces
- Hecuba
- Hellenes ("The Greeks")
- Io
- Medea or Argonautae ("Medea" or "The Argonauts")
- Melanippus
- Meleager
- Minos or Minotaurus ("Minos" or "The Minotaur")
- Myrmidones ("Myrmidons")
- Neoptolemus
- Nyctegresia ("The Night-Alarm")
- Oenomaus
- Parerga
- Pelopidae ("Pelops' Sons")
- Persidae ("Perseus' Sons")
- Philocteta or Philocteta Lemnius ("Philoctetes" or "Philoctetes on Lemnos")
- Phinidae ("The Sons of Phineus")
- Phoenissae ("The Phoenician Maidens")
- Pragmatica ("Principles for Playwrights")
- Praxidicus or Praxidica ("The Practical Adviser" or "Practical Hints")
- Stasiastae or Tropaeum Liberi ("The Rebels" or "Liber's Trophy")
- Tereus
- Thebais ("A Tale of Thebes")
- Troades ("Women of Troy")

== Sources ==
- G. Manuwald, Accius und seine Zeit (Würzburg 2002).
- B. Baldarelli, Accius und die vortrojanische Pelopidensage (Paderborn 2004).
- Warmington, E. H. (1936), "Livius Andronicus, Naevius, Pacuvius, Accius", Remains of Old Latin, Volume II: Livius Andronicus. Naevius. Pacuvius. Accius, Loeb Classical Library, Cambridge, Massachushetts: Harvard University Press

The cited also includes these authorities:

- Boissier, Le Poète Accius, 1856
- L. Müller, De Accii fabulis Disputatio (1890)
- Ribbeck, Geschichte der römischen Dichtung (1892)
- Editions of the tragic fragments by Ribbeck (1897), of the others by Bährens (1886)
- Plessis, Poésie latine (1909)
