= Tantalus =

Greek mythological figure and son of Zeus

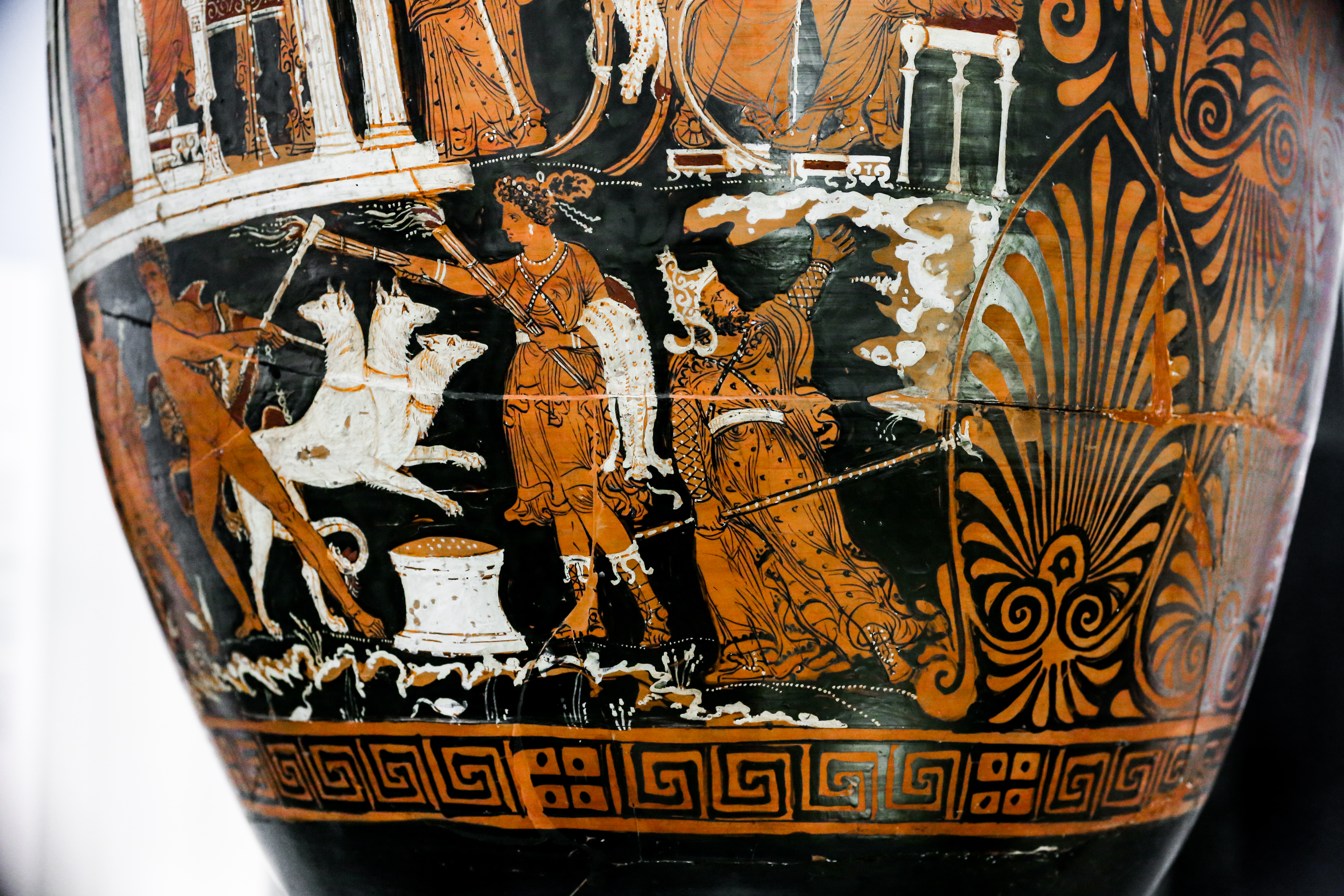
Tantalus on an Apulian red-figure volute krater, c. 330-320 BC, Staatliche Antikensammlungen.

Tantalus (Ancient Greek: Τάνταλος, romanized: Tántalos), was a Greek mythological figure, most famous for his punishment in Tartarus: for either revealing many secrets of the gods, for stealing ambrosia from them, or for trying to trick them into eating his son, he was made to stand in a pool of water beneath a fruit tree with low branches, with the fruit ever eluding his grasp, and the water always receding before he could take a drink. This punishment, although the best-known today, was a more unusual detail in surviving early Greek sources, where variants including a stone suspended above his head are more commonly recorded.

The ancient Greeks used the proverb "Tantalean punishment" (Ancient Greek: Ταντάλειοι τιμωρίαι: Tantáleioi timōríai), in reference to people with nice things who are unable to experience them. His name and punishment are also the source of the English word tantalize, meaning to torment with the sight of something desired but out of reach; tease by arousing expectations that are repeatedly disappointed. 'The rock of Tantalus' was also used as a proverbial expression by Pindar and Archilochus, in the same vein as the Sword of Damocles, to suggest being unable to enjoy something because attempting to do so places one in a position of perpetual imminent peril.

== Etymology ==
Plato in the Cratylus (395e) interprets Τάνταλος (Tántalos) as ταλάντατος (talántatos) [acc. ταλάντατον: talántaton in the original], "who has to bear much" from τάλας (tálas) "wretched". The Third Vatican Mythographer claims that the name means "wishing for a vision".

The word τάλας (tálas) is held by some to be inherited from Proto-Indo-European, although R. S. P. Beekes rejects an Indo-European interpretation.

Based on a similarity between the names Tantalus and Hantili, Martin Litchfield West has suggested that the name Tantalus may have derived from that of these two Hittite kings.

== Historical background ==
There may have been a historical Tantalus, possibly the ruler of an Anatolian city named "Tantalís", "the city of Tantalus", or of a city named "Sipylus". Pausanias reports that there was a port under his name and a sepulcher of him "by no means obscure", in the same region.

Tantalus is sometimes referred to as "King of Phrygia", although his city was located in the western extremity of Anatolia, where Lydia was to emerge as a state before the beginning of the first millennium BCE, and not in the traditional heartland of Phrygia, situated more inland. References to his son as "Pelops the Lydian" led some scholars to the conclusion that there would be good grounds for believing that he belonged to a primordial house of Lydia.

Other versions name his father as Tmolus, the name of a king of Lydia and, like Sipylus, of another mountain in ancient Lydia. The location of Tantalus's mortal mountain-fathers generally placed him in Lydia; and more seldom in Phrygia or Paphlagonia, all in Asia Minor.

The geographer Strabo states that the wealth of Tantalus was derived from the mines of Phrygia and Mount Sipylus. Near Mount Sipylus are archaeological features that have been associated with Tantalus and his house since Antiquity. Near Mount Yamanlar in İzmir (ancient Smyrna), where the Lake Karagöl (Lake Tantalus) associated with the accounts surrounding him is found, is a monument mentioned by Pausanias: the tholos "tomb of Tantalus" (later Christianized as "Saint Charalambos's tomb") and another one in Mount Sipylus, and where a "throne of Pelops", an altar or bench carved in rock and conjecturally associated with his son is found.

== Family ==
Tantalus was generally said to be a son of Zeus and a woman named Pluto. In a few sources Tmolus is given as the father. The identity of his wife is variously given: (1) generally as Dione the daughter of Atlas; (2) Euryanassa, daughter of Pactolus, a river god of Anatolia; (3) Eurythemista, daughter of the river-god Xanthus, (4) Eupryto and lastly, (5) Clytia, the child of Amphidamantes.

Tantalus was the father of Pelops, Niobe, and Broteas. A scholium on the Argonautica of Apollonius Rhodius adds Dascylus as a child of Tantalus. Through Pelops, Tantalus was the progenitor of the House of Atreus, which was named after his grandson Atreus and which was plagued by misfortune, making the house the subject of many Greek tragedies.

Comparative table of Tantalus's family
Relation and Name	Sources														
Relation and Name	Scholia Euripides	Isocrates	Scholia Ap.Rh.	Diodorus Siculus	Ovid	Strabo	Statius	Plutarch	Hyginus	Pausanias	Nonnus	Servius	Tzetzes	Apostolius	Others Sources
Parentage
Tmolus and Pluto	✔												✔		
Zeus	✔			✔			✔								Tacitus
Zeus and Pluto									✔	✔	✔				Clement, Antoninus
Spouse
Euryanassa	✔							✔					✔		
Dione					✔				✔			✔			
Eurythemiste	✔														
Clytia	✔														
Eupryto														✔	
Children
Pelops	✔	✔		✔	✔	✔	✔	✔	✔	✔	✔	✔		✔	Pindar, Aristophanes, Lycophron, Horace, Parthenius
Niobe	✔	✔		✔	✔	✔	✔		✔	✔	✔			✔	Apollodorus, Greek Anthology
Dascylus			✔												
Broteas	✔									✔				✔	

Tantalus's grave-sanctuary stood on Sipylus but honours were paid him at Argos, where local tradition claimed to possess his bones. In Lesbos, there was another hero-shrine in the small settlement of Polion and a mountain named after Tantalus.

== Mythology ==
=== Punishment in Hades ===
The oldest surviving reference to Tantalus is the Odyssey. Odysseus sees him there when he journeys to Hades, standing in a pool of water up to his chin beneath a fruit tree with low branches. Whenever Tantalus reached for the fruit, the wind blew the branches out of his reach; whenever he tried to drink, the water receded before he could reach it. However, the crime for which this is the punishment is not mentioned. The earliest account of Tantalus's crime is that found in a fragment of the lost Nostoi preserved in the Deipnosophistae of Athenaeus. Tantalus is punished by Zeus after Zeus swears an oath to give him anything he asks for, and Tantalus asks to be allowed to live like the gods. Zeus is bound by his oath to do this, but as a punishment Zeus places a giant rock above his head so that, although Tantalus has access to a banquet akin to that which the gods enjoy, fear of the rock falling prevents him from ever enjoying it.

In other surviving early Greek sources, the stone perpetually hanging above Tantalus's head is the more popular variant of the punishment. The rock is also mentioned in fragments of Archilochus, Alcman, Alcaeus, and Pherecydes. The crime for which this is the punishment is, however, absent from the fragments.

Pausanias (c. 110–180 CE) reports that in the Knidian lesche, a building at Delphi full of paintings by Polygnotus depicting different mythological scenes, Tantalus is shown enduring both the punishment of the retreating food and drink recorded in the Odyssey and that of the rock hanging above his head. Pausanias states that Polygnotus is following the tradition of the poet Archilochus, but adds that he does not know whether Archilochus was the origin of this variant or whether he was following another source. Apollodorus also records both punishments together. Other allusions to the story generally tend to continue to refer to either the rock alone, or the rock and the receding food and water. Further reference to the punishment but without mention of the specific crime are found in Horace (65 BCE–8 CE), who mentions the receding water in the first Satire, Lucretius (c. 99–55 BCE), who mentions Tantalus's fear of a boulder hanging in the air, and Vergil, who in the Aeneid mentions a crag hanging over him.

Despite the crime of attempting to feed his son to the gods being the most well-known variant today, in antiquity there were multiple variants reporting different crimes. Most, but not all, of these involve a feast to some degree. References to the attempt to feed the gods his dismembered son appear comparatively late in the surviving sources.

=== Feasting ===
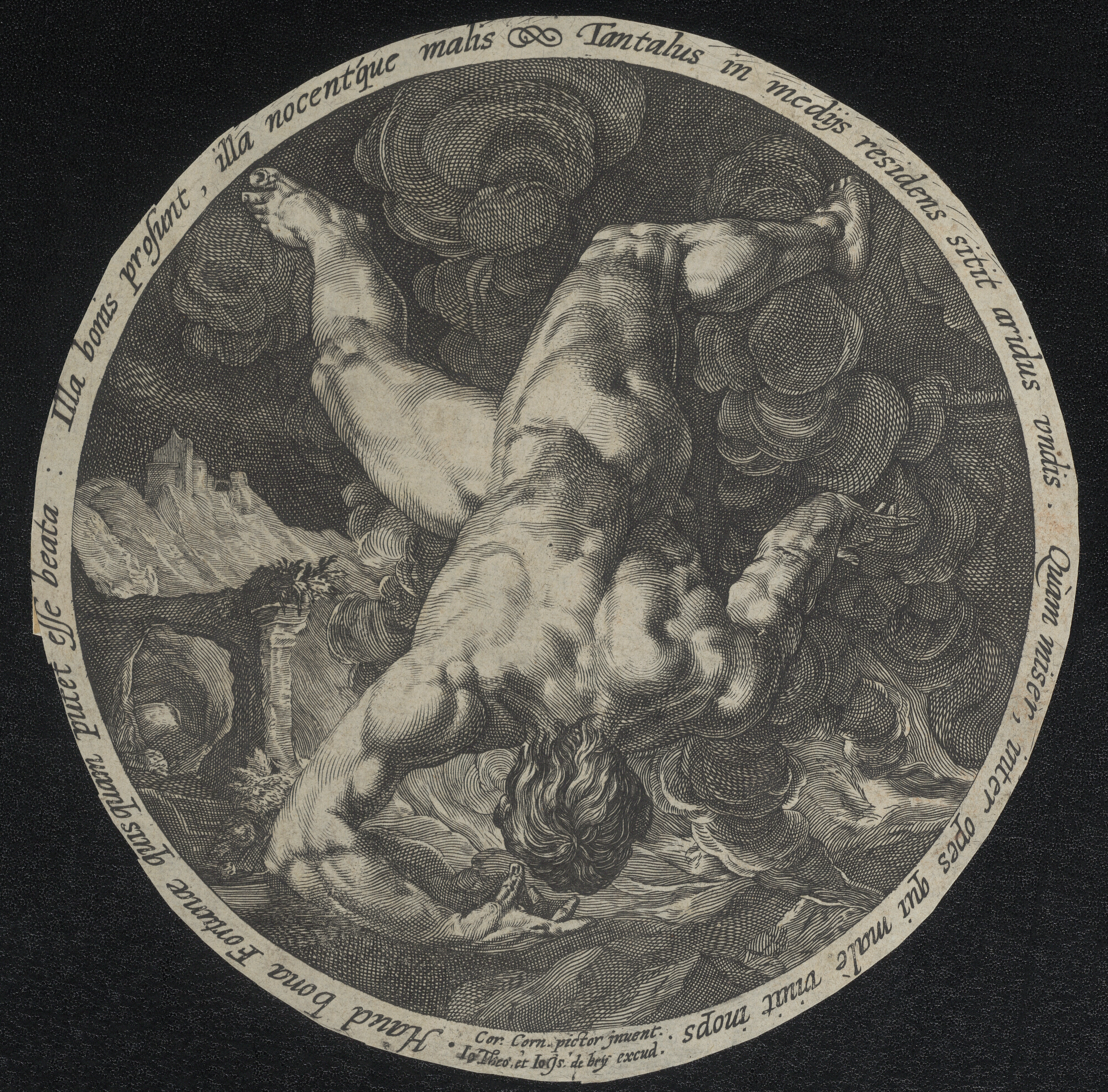
Print of the fall of Tantalus. Preserved in the Ghent University Library.

The variant in which Tantalus attempts to feed the gods his dismembered son is, however, clearly familiar to audiences by the time of Pindar (c. 518–438 BCE). In his first Olympian Ode, Pindar initially alludes to the story in which Pelops is killed, served as food, and partially eaten, by explaining that Clotho, one of the three Fates, revived Pelops in a cauldron, replacing his shoulder with one of ivory. A scholiast commenting on this passage in Pindar reports that according to Bacchylides (c. 518–c. 451 BCE), it was Rhea who revived Pelops by placing him in a cauldron.

However, in Olympian 1 Pindar rejects this version, implying that it is a lie and adding that it is better to speak well of the gods. He then relates a different account in which Tantalus invited the gods to a meal to repay them for inviting him to feast with them. Nothing went amiss with the meal, but Poseidon, on seeing Pelops, was overcome with desire for him and carried him off in his chariot. The sudden disappearance of Pelops, and the failure of attempts to find him, led envious neighbours to spread rumours that he had been killed, cooked, and eaten. Pindar's choice of words in describing these rumoured events imply that the gods also participated in the act of killing Pelops. Although it is possible Pindar is reporting a variant he was aware of, Douglas Gerber suggests that the implication that the gods participated in the gruesome acts is meant to elevate the horror of the scene, and thus simultaneously make it seem less believable. In a similar vein, in the Iphigenia in Tauris of Euripides, Iphigenia refers to the 'feast of Tantalus' that the gods attended and enjoyed as unworthy of belief. It is unclear, however, whether her denial is that the gods enjoyed the meal, or that they ate it at all, or that Tantalus attempted to feed the gods his son, and whether Euripides meant Iphigenia's denial to follow Pindar's variant in which Tantalus is the victim of the rumours of envious neighbours cannot be established by what is given in the play. In Euripides's Helen the character of Menelaus, mentions Pelops in relation to a feast, but the feast is referred to one which Pelops himself was 'persuaded' to make. The text, however, is generally considered corrupt, rather than referring to an otherwise unknown variant in which Pelops himself agreed to host a banquet.

After denying that Tantalus's crime was that of the cannibal banquet, Pindar then claims that his offence was stealing nectar and ambrosia from the gods – substances which they had used to make him immortal – and giving it to his friends. Zeus's punishment for Tantalus is to hang a boulder above his head, from which he then perpetually flees. It is unclear where Pindar imagines Tantalus's punishment as taking place. Some have argued that in the Nostoi Tantalus's punishment took place on Olympus and that Pindar was following this model. Gerber points out, however, that there are no other instances in which a mortal's punishment takes place on Olympus, and adds that it is difficult to imagine that the gods would enjoy the constant presence of the suffering Tantalus at their banquets. The punishment of the hanging rock is also mentioned by Electra in Euripides's Orestes, where Tantalus is located somewhere between heaven and earth, flying hither and thither in the air (ἀέρι ποτᾶται) in an attempt to escape the bolder above his head. The crime for which this is the punishment is, however, not detailed. A scholiast on the passage states that he was placed in the sky so that he was far enough from Olympus so as not to be able to hear the conversation of the gods, and far enough away from mortals so as not to be able to tell them anything he had already heard. Similarly, Diodorus Siculus (1st century BCE) recounts that his crime was sharing with mortals the intimate conversations of the gods, an explanation which Ovid also gives in the Ars Amatoria. Apollodorus gives both the theft of ambrosia and the sharing of the secrets of the gods as his crimes.

The first surviving source to name the Demeter as the god who ate part of Pelops is the Alexandra of Lycophron (c. 300 BCE), in which she is referred to via several epithets. The details given are that she ate the shoulder of the grandfather of Menelaeus (who is himself cryptically referred to by way of his genealogy), but nothing is said about how Pelops's shoulder came to be eaten, its replacement, or the punishment of Tantalus. In the Metamorphoses Ovid relates in book 6 that Pelops has a shoulder of ivory because he was cut up by his father, and that the gods restored him, except for a part of his shoulder which was absent (defuit), and in books 4 and 10 the punishment of Tantalus is mentioned in passing and includes receding waters and retreating trees. The story is also mentioned in the Fabulae. The details given are that Pelops was dismembered by Tantalus at a feast of the gods, that Ceres – the Roman counterpart to Demeter – ate a part of his arm, that the gods restored him to life, and that Ceres replaced the part of his shoulder that was missing with ivory. An explanation for why Demeter alone would fail to notice the content of the meal is given in later sources, with a scholium on Lycophron stating that Demeter was distracted by the loss of her daughter Persephone.

Likewise, an explanation as to why Tantalus attempted to feed his son to the gods is not found in any sources until Servius (early 5th century CE), who gives as Tantalus's motivation a desire to test the gods. A scholium on Lycophron suggests that this was a gesture of hospitality, but gives no explanation as to why it should be interpreted as such.

The story of Tantalus is also reported by the Vatican Mythographers. The first mythographer states that it was Ceres who ate Pelops's shoulder and then gave him the ivory replacement. The mythographer offers an allegorical interpretation of Ceres's involvement, explaining that she is the deity who ate him because goddess of earth, and earth consumes the bodies of the dead, but leaves the bones. The second and third mythographers also state that it was Ceres who ate part of Pelops, for the same allegorical reason, but do not mention the ivory replacement for the lost part. They instead state that it was Mercury who restored Pelops to life, and explain that this is because Mercury is the god of intelligence.

A Scholium on Lykophron suggests that either Tantalus 'was attempting to be hospitable, or to make a significant contribution to the eranos to which the gods had invited him (schol ad Lyc. 152, = ad Ol. 1.40a). The scholiast also notes that according to some it is either Themis or Thetis (the scholium survives in several manuscripts, and the name differs between them) who ate the shoulder.

=== The golden dog ===
In a different tradition, Tantalus was implicated in the theft of the gold dog which Rhea had once put to watch over the goat nourishing the infant Zeus when she hid him in a cave on Crete. The story is recorded by Antoninus Liberalis as well as in scholia on Pindar's Olympian 1 and on the Odyssey.

Antoninus Liberalis reports that Pandareus stole a golden dog who guarded the cave in Crete in which Rhea had hidden him from Cronus. Rhea had initially set the dog to guard the goat which was providing Zeus with milk. Later, after making the goat 'an immortal' Zeus ordered the dog to continue guarding the Cretan cave. Having stolen the dog, Pandareus then gave it to Tantalus for safekeeping. When he later returned and asked for the dog, Tantalus swore an oath that he had never received it. Zeus punished Pandareus for the theft by turning him to stone and Tantalus for swearing a false oath by striking him with a thunderbolt and placing Mount Sipylus on top of him.

Variants of this appear in late sources: scholia on the Odyssey state that Zeus told Hermes to go to Tantalus and get back the dog, and it was Hermes to whom Tantalus lied (but Hermes found and retrieved it anyway), and another variant is reported therein in which Tantalus himself steals the dog. In one version, it was a mechanical dog crafted by Hephaestus to guard a temple of Zeus. There were multiple plays, now lost, written about Tantalus in antiquity, and it is generally assumed that they relate to this incident rather than anything involving a feast.

== In classical drama ==
Tantalus appeared in Aeschylus' lost play Niobe, which was set after the catastrophic revenge of Artemis and Apollo that left all of Niobe's numerous children lying dead on the ground. The inconsolable Niobe was sitting veiled and speechless at her children's tomb as Tantalus arrived at Thebes, at first not knowing that had transpired; surviving fragments show Tantalus boasting of his lands in unknowing bliss, then trying in vain to comfort his daughter, and in the end escorting her back home to Lydia (as her husband Amphion had probably perished as well).

Tantalus also briefly appears in Thyestes, a tragedy by Roman author Seneca. The ghost of the tormented Tantalus is brought from the Underworld by one of the Furies, and commanded to sow wickedness and enmity between his grandsons Atreus and Thyestes, exiled by their father Pelops due to the murder of their half-brother Chrysippus and further quarrelling over the rulership of their new kingdom. The play's chorus, old men from Mycenae and Argos, declare that they will prevent the imminent crimes, and speak of Tantalus' old offences.

== Tantalus in art ==
To date all known depictions of Tantalus in ancient art date from the fifth century BCE onwards. Tantalus is depicted on the name vase of the Underworld Painter – an apulian red-figure volute-krater illustrating the palace of Hades and Persephone surrounded by scenes from the underworld. He is pictured in the lower right corner of the painting, pointing to a rock hanging over him from which he is attempting to flee. This vase, and the painting of Polygnotes described by Pausanias are to date the only known artistic representations of the punishment of the rock.

He is also shown in an underworld scene on the back lower register of the Velletri Sarcophagus, to the right of the central carving of Charon in the boat which escorts the departed to the underworld. Tantalus is shown naked, standing in water which reaches up to his knees. The position in which he is holding his hands suggests that he is attempted to raise to his mouth water which he has scooped up in his cupped hands.

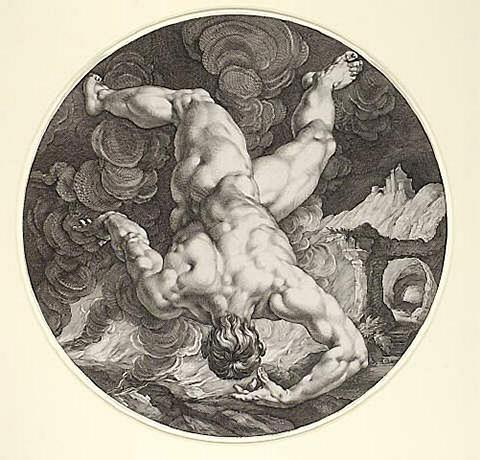
Engraving by Hendrik Goltzius and C. Cornelius (1588)

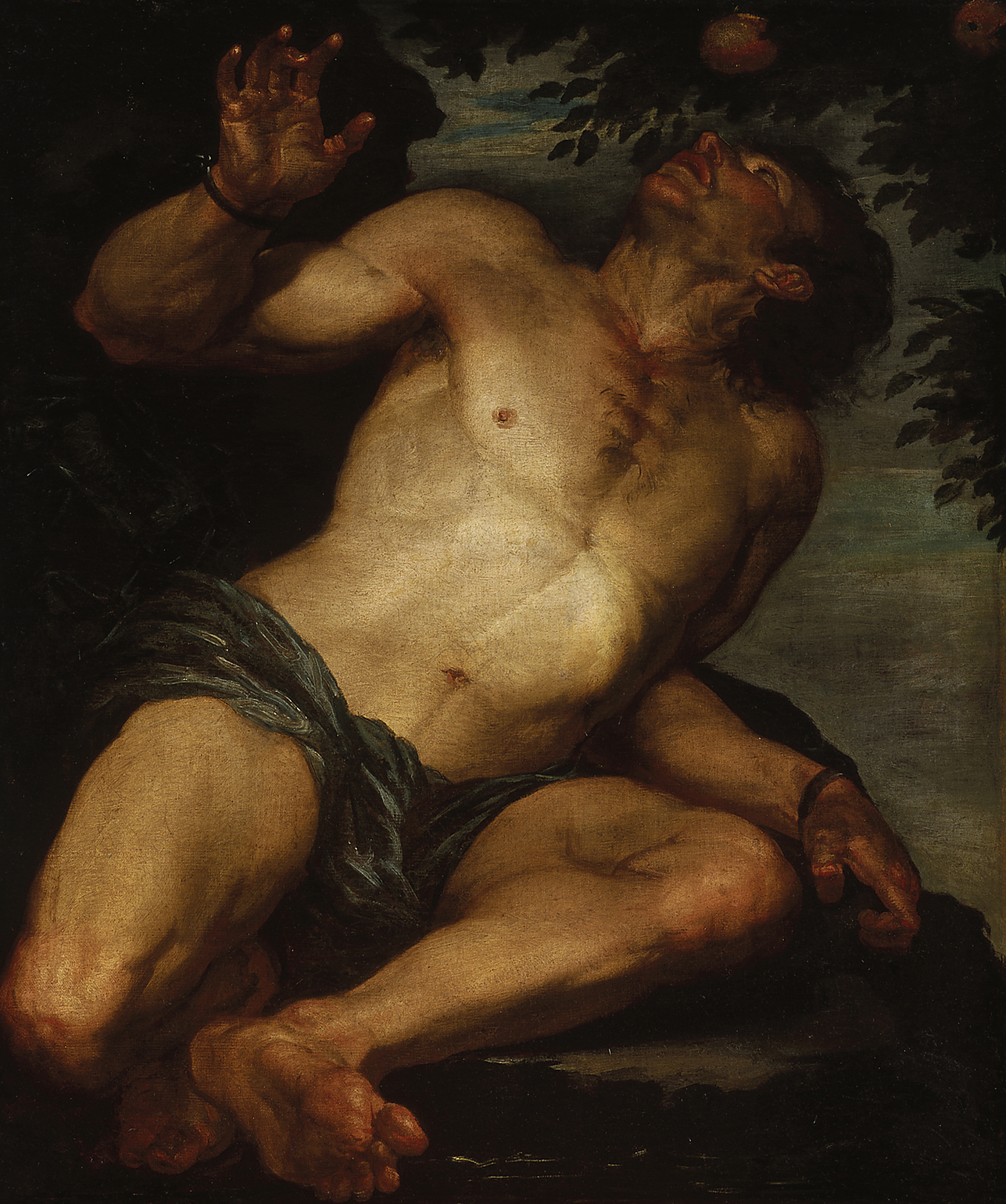
Oil painting by Gioacchino Assereto (circa 1640s)

== See also ==
- Child cannibalism
- Lycaon (king of Arcadia)
- Prometheus
- Sisyphus
- Xenia, the Greek concept of hospitality, which Tantalus is described as breaking

== Bibliography ==
- Antoninus Liberalis, The Metamorphoses of Antoninus Liberalis translated by Francis Celoria (Routledge 1992). Online version at the Topos Text Project.
- Apollodorus, The Library with an English Translation by Sir James George Frazer, F.B.A., F.R.S. in 2 Volumes, Cambridge, MA, Harvard University Press; London, William Heinemann Ltd. 1921. ISBN 0-674-99135-4. Online version at the Perseus Digital Library. Greek text available from the same website.
- Chisholm, Hugh, ed. (1911). "Tantalus" . Encyclopædia Britannica. Vol. 26 (11th ed.). Cambridge University Press. p. 401.
- Bacchylides Carmina cum fragmentis eds B. Snell and H. Maehler. Teubner. 1970.
- Burian, Peter (2007). Euripides - Helen. Aris & Phillips Classicas Texts, Oxbow Books. p. 214.
- Diodorus Siculus, The Library of History translated by Charles Henry Oldfather. Twelve volumes. Loeb Classical Library. Cambridge, Massachusetts: Harvard University Press; London: William Heinemann, Ltd. 1989. Vol. 3. Books 4.59–8. Online version at Bill Thayer's Web Site
- Diodorus Siculus, Bibliotheca Historica. Vol 1–2. Immanel Bekker. Ludwig Dindorf. Friedrich Vogel. in aedibus B. G. Teubneri. Leipzig. 1888–1890. Greek text available at the Perseus Digital Library.
- Euripides, The Complete Greek Drama, edited by Whitney J. Oates and Eugene O'Neill Jr. in two volumes. 2. Orestes, translated by Robert Potter. New York. Random House. 1938. Online version at the Perseus Digital Library.
- Euripides, Euripidis Fabulae. vol. 3. Gilbert Murray. Oxford. Clarendon Press, Oxford. 1913. Greek text available at the Perseus Digital Library.
- Gantz, Timothy (1993). Early Greek Myth. Baltimore: Johns Hopkins University Press.
- Gerber, Douglas (1982). Pindar's 'Olympian One' - A Commentary. University of Toronto Press.
- Homer, The Odyssey with an English Translation by A.T. Murray, Ph.D. in two volumes. Cambridge, MA., Harvard University Press; London, William Heinemann, Ltd. 1919. ISBN 978-0674995611. Online version at the Perseus Digital Library. Greek text available from the same website.
- Hyginus, Fabulae from The Myths of Hyginus translated and edited by Mary Grant. University of Kansas Publications in Humanistic Studies. Online version at the Topos Text Project.
- Janka, Markus (1997). Ovid, Ars amatoria: Buch 2 Kommentar. C. Winter. ISBN 3-8253-0593-7.
- Kerenyi, Karl (1959). The Heroes of the Greeks. New York/London: Thames and Hudson.
- Kyriakou, Poulheria (2006). A commentary on Euripides' Iphigenia in Tauris. W. de Gruyter. ISBN 978-3-11-019099-1.
- Pausanias, Description of Greece with an English Translation by W.H.S. Jones, Litt.D., and H.A. Ormerod, M.A., in 4 Volumes. Cambridge, MA, Harvard University Press; London, William Heinemann Ltd. 1918. ISBN 0-674-99328-4. Online version at the Perseus Digital Library
- Pausanias, Graeciae Descriptio. 3 vols. Leipzig, Teubner. 1903. Greek text available at the Perseus Digital Library.
- Pindar, Odes translated by Diane Arnson Svarlien. 1990. Online version at the Perseus Digital Library.
- Pindar, The Odes of Pindar including the Principal Fragments with an Introduction and an English Translation by Sir John Sandys, Litt.D., FBA. Cambridge, MA., Harvard University Press; London, William Heinemann Ltd. 1937. Greek text available at the Perseus Digital Library.
- Ovid, Metamorphoses translated by Brookes More (1859–1942). Boston, Cornhill Publishing Co. 1922. Online version at the Perseus Digital Library.
- Ovid, Metamorphoses. Hugo Magnus. Gotha (Germany). Friedr. Andr. Perthes. 1892. Latin text available at the Perseus Digital Library.
- Peppin, Ronald E. The Vatican mythographers - an English translation. Fordham University Press. 2008.
- Schwartz, Eduard. Scholia in Euripidem. Euripides. Works
- Seaford, Richard (2005). "Death and Wedding in Aeschylus' Niobe". In McHardy, Fiona; Robson, James; Harvey, David (eds.). Lost Dramas of Classical Athens: Greek Tragic Fragments. Exeter, UK: University of Exeter Press. ISBN 978-0-85989-752-5.
- Smith, William, ed. (1848). "Ta'ntalus". Dictionary of Greek and Roman Biography and Mythology.
- Strabo, The Geography of Strabo. Edition by H.L. Jones. Cambridge, Mass.: Harvard University Press; London: William Heinemann, Ltd. 1924. Online version at the Perseus Digital Library.
- Strabo, Geographica edited by A. Meineke. Leipzig: Teubner. 1877. Greek text available at the Perseus Digital Library.
- Suida, Suda Encyclopedia translated by Ross Scaife, David Whitehead, William Hutton, Catharine Roth, Jennifer Benedict, Gregory Hays, Malcolm Heath Sean M. Redmond, Nicholas Fincher, Patrick Rourke, Elizabeth Vandiver, Raphael Finkel, Frederick Williams, Carl Widstrand, Robert Dyer, Joseph L. Rife, Oliver Phillips and many others. Online version at the Topos Text Project.
