= Mount Sipylus =

Mountain in Manisa, Turkey

Mount Spil
- Mount Sipylus
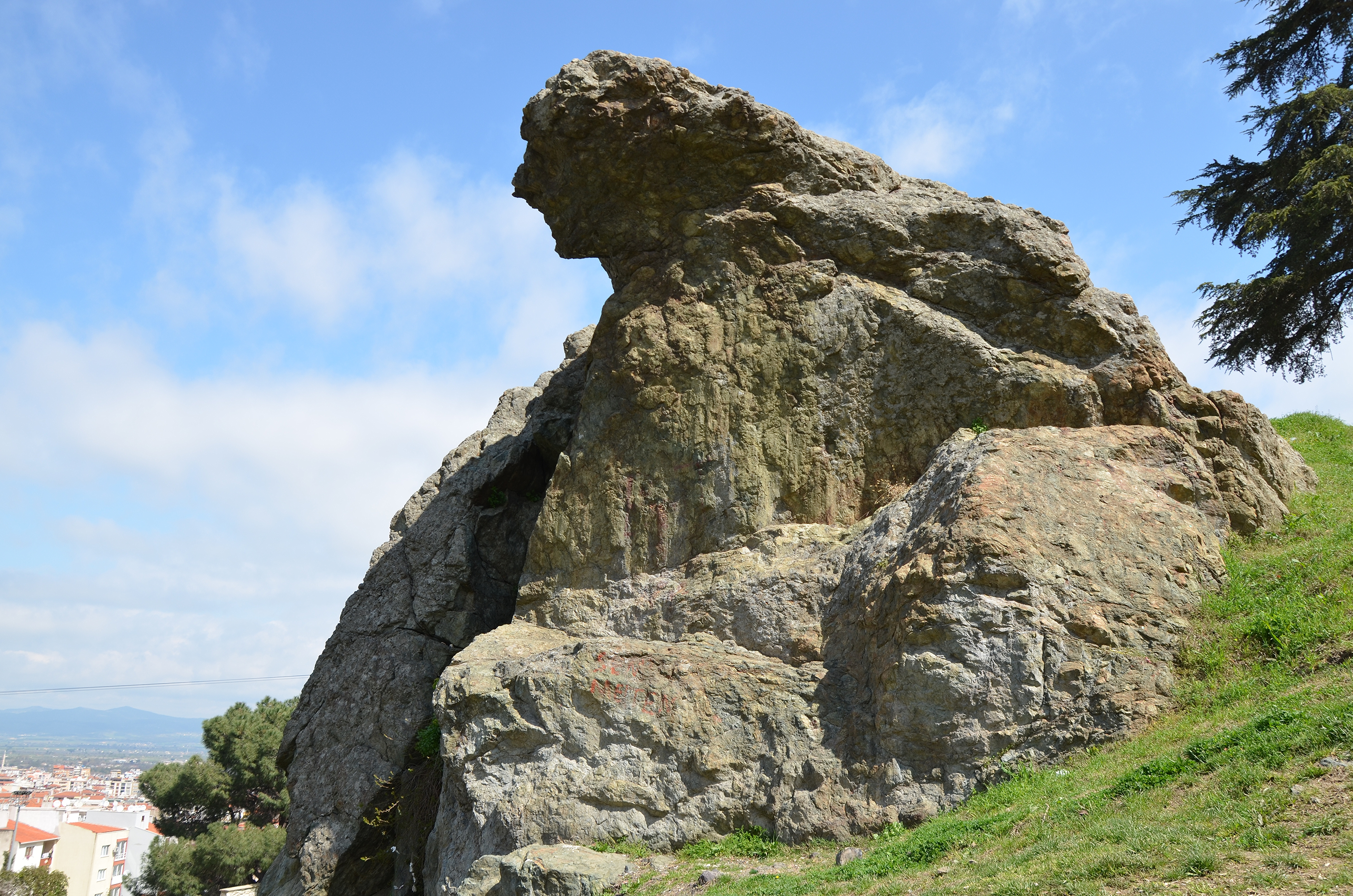
- The "Weeping Rock" associated with Niobe on Mount Sipylus

Highest point
- Elevation: 1,513 m (4,964 ft)see section
- Coordinates: 38°34′02″N 27°27′17″E

Geography
- Location within Turkey
- Location: Manisa, Turkey

Geology
- Mountain type: Shield volcano

Mount Spil (Turkish: Spil Dağı), also known as Mount Sipylus (Ancient Greek: Σίπυλος) (elevation 1,513 m or 4,964 ft), is a mountain in Manisa Province, Turkey.

It is located near the modern city of Manisa as well as over the road between İzmir and Manisa. The contiguous mass of Mount Yamanlar, also located close to the Gulf of İzmir, has often been considered an extension of the Mount Sipylus massif, although it is actually an extinct volcano and a distinct geographical formation.

== History ==
The Manisa relief, a full-faced statue carved into a cliff face, is found near Mount Sipylus, several kilometers east of Manisa. According to the Byzantine commentator John the Lydian, the unknown author of the 7th-century BCE epic poem, the Titanomachy, placed the birth of Zeus not in Crete but in Lydia, which should signify Mount Sipylus.

The names "Sipylus" or "Sipylum" are mentioned by Pliny the Elder, supported by other sources, as the site of a very celebrated city called "Tantalis" or "the city of Tantalus", after the name of its founder. Presumably located on or very near the mountain, the city's ruins were reportedly still visible around the beginning of the Common Era. According to a late pseudo-Plutarchic text known as De fluviis ("on rivers"), Sipylus was a man who was relentlessly tormented by the Furies until he eventually hanged himself for accidentally killing his mother Dioxippe; afterwards the gods gave his name to the mountain.

The same Tantalus is famed throughout Greek mythology thanks to the accounts that he had cut up his son Pelops and served him up as food for the gods. His son Pelops is said to have later migrated to the Peloponnese, named after him, and to have founded a kingdom there. Tantalus' daughter was the tragic Niobe, who is associated with the "Weeping Rock" (Ağlayan Kaya in Turkish), a natural formation facing the city of Manisa. The Greek deities Apollo and Artemis were said to have killed all 14 children of Niobe at Mount Sipylus, whereupon the grief-stricken Niobe was turned to stone.

Later in ancient times, Mount Sipylus (Ancient Greek: Σίπυλος) rose above the site of Magnesia ad Sipylum (the southern portion of modern Manisa), whose existence is traced back as far as the 5th century BCE. Magnesia was located along the Hermus River (Gediz River) on the plain below and was the scene of the defeat of Antiochus III "the Great" by the Romans at the Battle of Magnesia in 190 BCE. The city of Smyrna lay nearby.

== Spil today ==
An important reforestation effort was begun in the 1960s, covering thousands of hectares on and around the mountain. Since then, Spil Dağı National Park has attracted many foreign and domestic tourists. The famous "Weeping Rock" is still widely visited.

The mountain as a whole presents an area of dense forests and is known for its wild tulips. The mountain is also a common spot for camping, parachuting, hiking and other mountain sports.

The motorway connecting the two regional metropolitan centers, İzmir and Manisa, crosses between the two neighboring masses of Mount Sipylus and Mount Yamanlar through the Sabuncubeli Pass, which was much described by ancient travellers and writers and which descends from an altitude of 600 m to sea-level in only a few kilometers. The highest point of the pass corresponds to a point near the boundary between İzmir Province and Manisa Province. To bypass the steep and twisted Sabuncubeli Pass, the 6,480-metre (21,260 ft)-long Sabuncubeli Tunnel was built from 2011 to 2018.
