= Eurythemista =

In Greek mythology, the name Eurythemista (/jʊərɪθɪˈmɪstə/) or Eurythemiste (/-ˈmɪstiː/; Ancient Greek: Εὐρυθεμίστη, lit. 'wide justice' or 'broad law of nature') may refer to:

- Eurythemista, a Calydonian princess as the daughter of King Porthaon and Laothoe. She was the sister of Sterope and Stratonice, wife of King Melaneus of Oechalia.
- Eurythemista, daughter of the river-god Xanthus, thus can be considered a naiad nymph. By Tantalus, she was one of the possible mother Pelops, Niobe and Broteas.
- Eurythemista, one of the two maidens that were wooed by Boeotus. He could not choose between the two until he saw a star fall on Eurythemiste's shoulder; he then took her to wife.
