= Phlegyas (Boeotia) =

Phlegyas (Ancient Greek: Φλεγύας) was a town of ancient Boeotia, on the boundary with Phocis. According to Greek mythology, it was founded by Phlegyas. It was located near Orchomenus, where its founder supposedly came to gather the most warlike Greeks. Later, the Phlegyans separated from the Orchomenians and were hostile to them, even going so far as to plunder the temple of Delphi. It was said that the gods punished the Phlegyans, destroyed almost all their lineage and what few survivors remaining managed to flee to Panopeus, in Phocis.

Its site is unlocated.
