= Jocasta =

Greek mythological Queen of Thebes

- Queen of Thebes
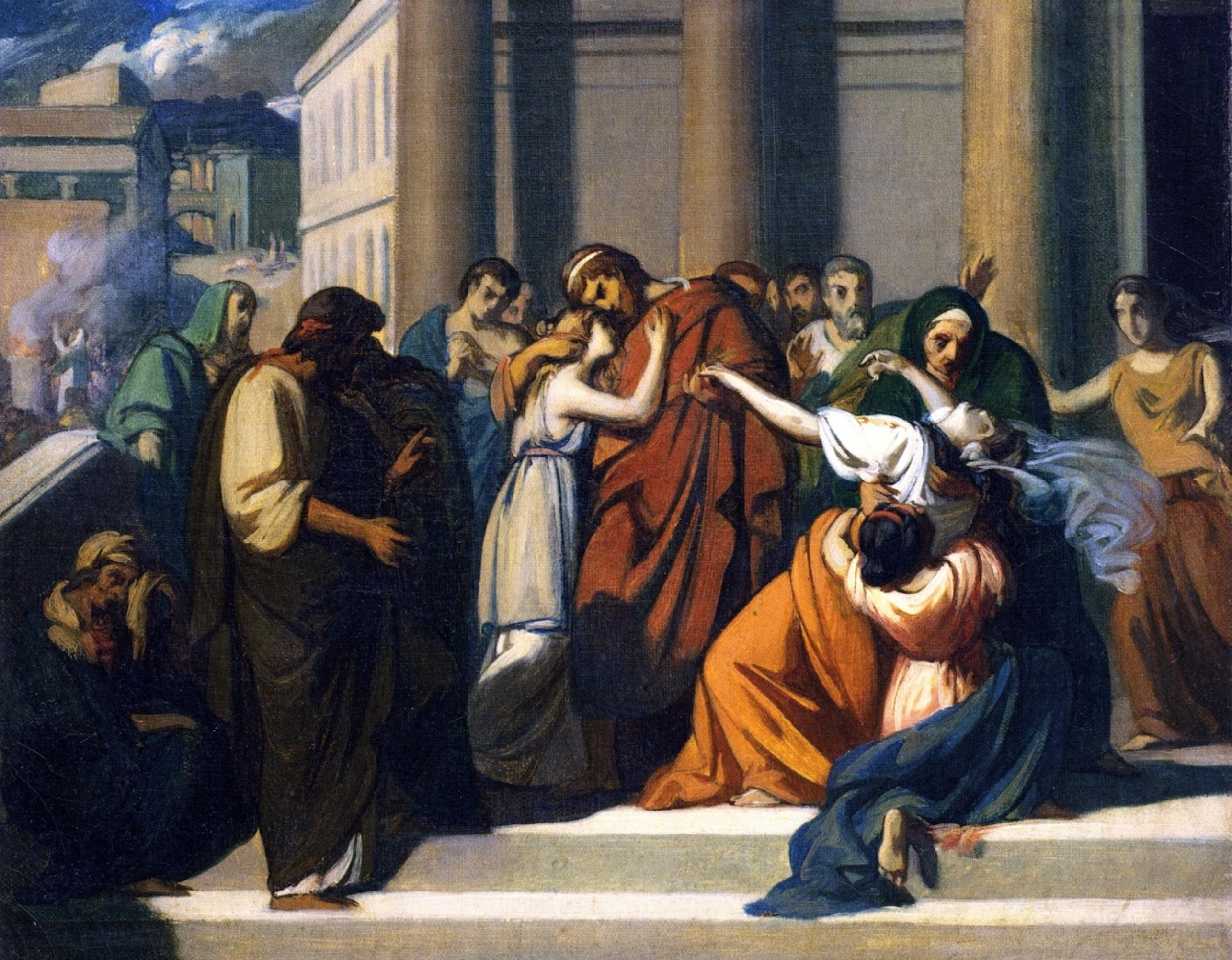
- Oedipus separating from Jocasta. Oil sketch by Alexandre Cabanel
- Abode: Thebes

Genealogy
- Parents: Menoeceus (father)
- Siblings: Creon and Hipponome
- Spouse: Laius, Oedipus
- Children: Oedipus, Antigone, Eteocles, Polynices, and Ismene

In Greek mythology, Jocasta (/dʒoʊˈkæstə/), also rendered as Iocaste (Ancient Greek: Ἰοκάστη Iokástē [i.okástɛː]) and Epicaste (/ˌɛpɪˈkæstiː/; Ἐπικάστη Epikástē), was Queen of Thebes through her marriages to Laius and her son, Oedipus. She is best known for her role in the myths surrounding Oedipus and her eventual suicide upon the discovery of his identity.

== Family ==
Jocasta was the daughter of an unknown woman and Menoeceus, a descendant of Cadmus, the legendary founder of Thebes, and the Spartoi Echion. She had two siblings: Creon and Hipponome. She was a member of the ruling class of Thebes, but her exact role before her marriage to Laius, the king of Thebes, is unknown.

With Laius, she became Queen of Thebes and gave birth to a son, Oedipus. Later, not knowing of Oedipus's identity, she married him and gave birth to Antigone, Eteocles, Polynices and Ismene. She was therefore both the mother and the grandmother of her children.

== Mythology ==
=== Early years ===
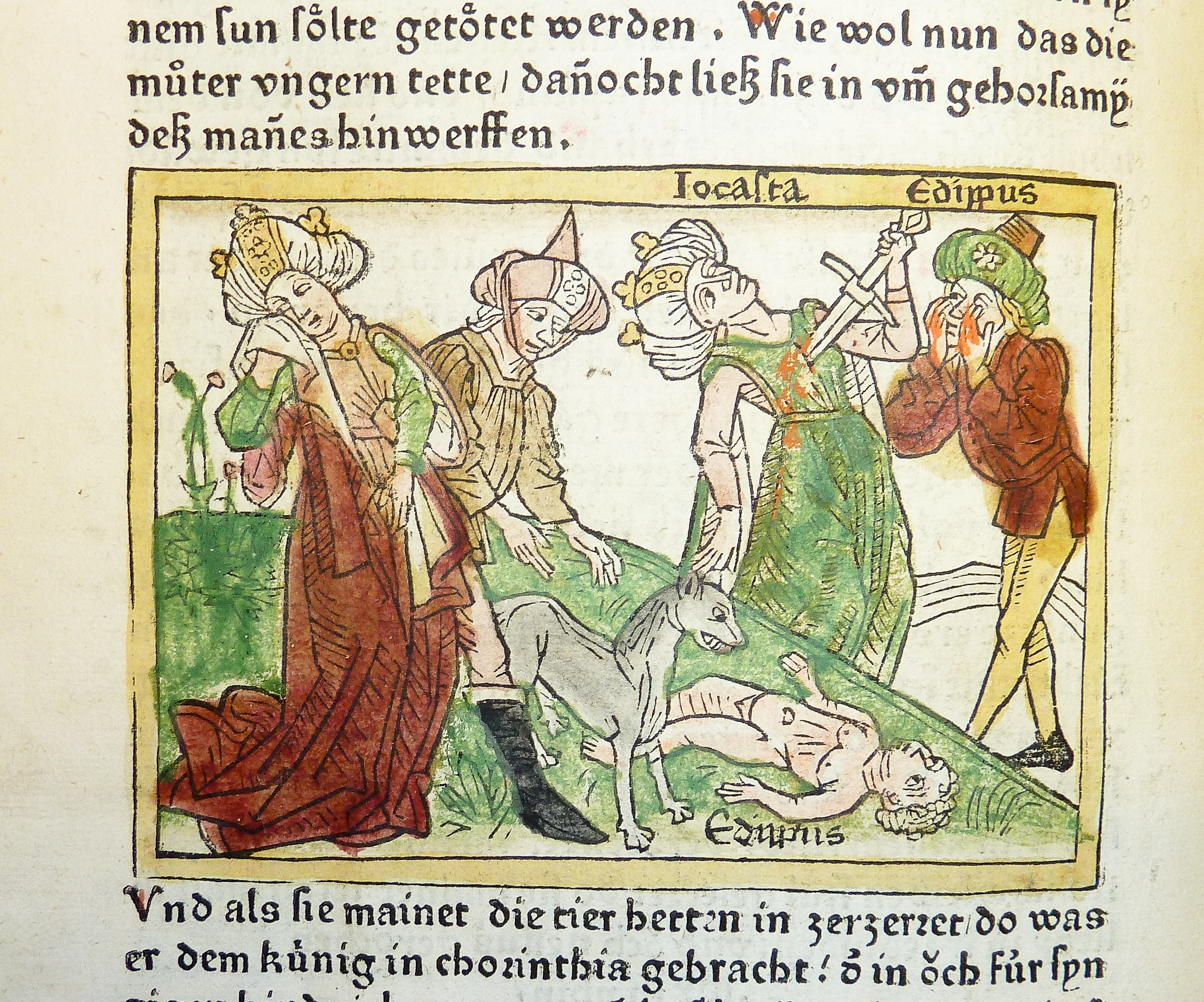
Jocasta committing suicide, medieval German woodcut print produced by Johannes Zainer (c.1474)

After Laius married Jocasta, he received an oracle from the Pythia at Delphi which told him that the gods did not wish him to have a child. If he disobeyed, the oracle prophesized that the child would one day kill him and marry Jocasta, and their descendants would be forever cursed with misfortune. However, one night, Laius became drunk and impregnated Jocasta. She gave birth to a son, but Laius still feared the prophecy and demanded that the child be killed.

Laius took the child, pierced its ankles with iron spikes and bound them together before instructing his shepherd Menoetes to expose the infant on Mount Cithaeron to succumb to the elements. However, the young child was found, either by Polybus, king of Corinth, or his wife, Periboea. The Dorian Merope has also been named as Polybus's wife who raised the child. The couple had no children, so they raised the child as their own and named him Oedipus (Οἰδίπους) after his swollen feet.

=== Oedipus' return ===
Oedipus was raised in Corinth under the assumption that he was the biological son of Polybus and his wife. After many years, Oedipus was either taunted by a drunk and told that he was a "bastard", or he was maliciously told by other young, jealous men that he could not possibly be Polybus's son. When Oedipus confronted his parents with these rumors, he did not receive an assuring response, and so journeyed to the oracle at Delphi for assistance. The Pythia informed Oedipus that he was fated to kill his father and to marry his mother. Fearing for the safety of the only parents known to him, Oedipus fled from Corinth towards Thebes before he could commit these sins.

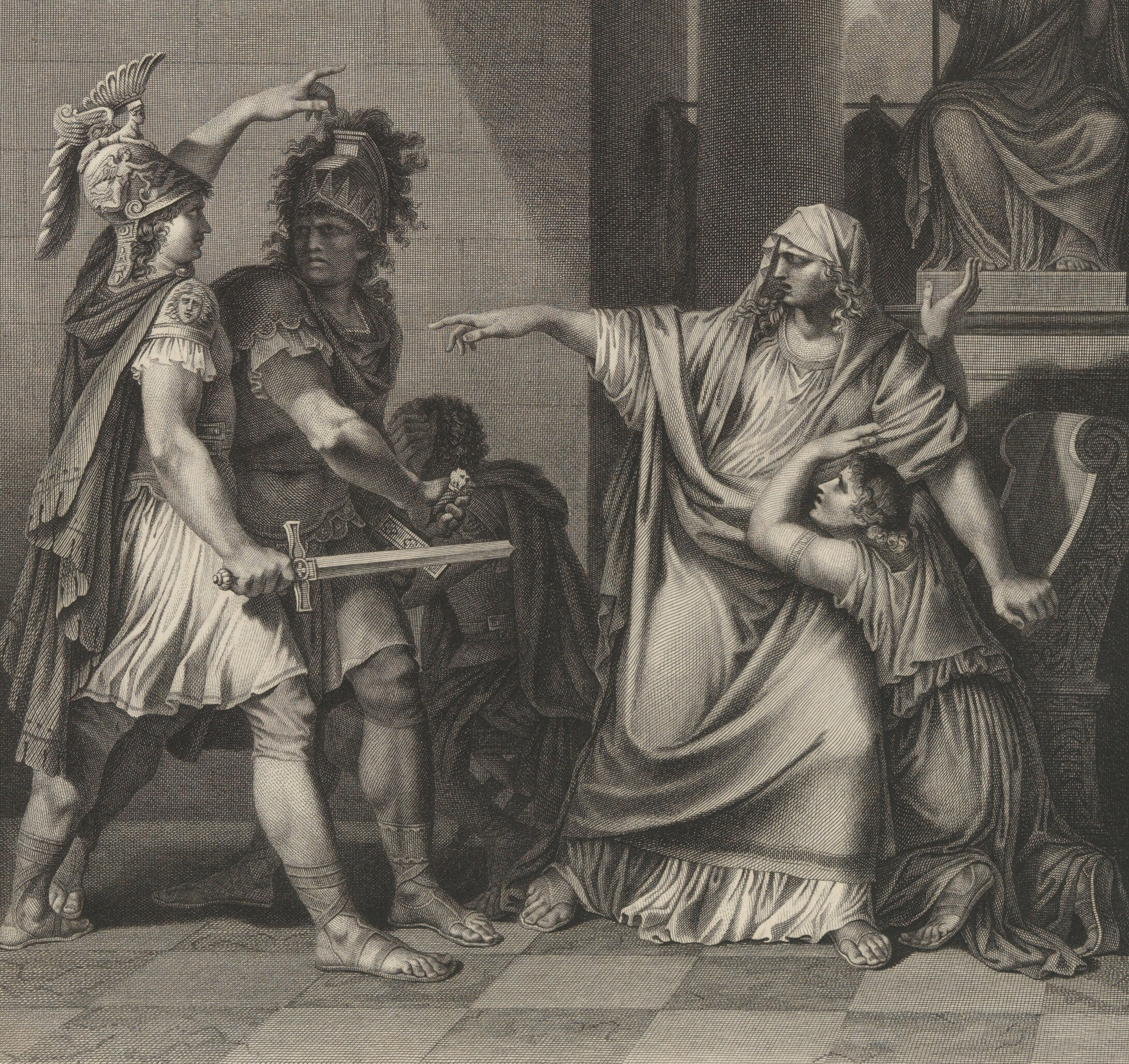
Jocasta failing to reconcile Eteocles and Polynices, engraving after Jean-Guillaume Moitte, published 1801

During his travels, Oedipus encountered Laius riding in a chariot along a narrow pass at Phocis. When Laius's herald Polyphontes demanded Oedipus move out of the way, the young man refused. Laius then either commanded that the chariot proceed, and the wheel crushed Oedipus's foot; or, Oedipus began to move but did not do so fast enough, and a servant of Laius killed one of his horses. Enraged, Oedipus killed Laius, and unknowingly fulfilled the first half of the prophecy.

Oedipus continued his journey to Thebes and discovered that the city was being terrorized by the sphinx. Creon, Jocasta's brother and the acting regent, put out a notice that whoever solved the sphinx's riddle would be rewarded with the throne and Jocasta's hand in marriage. Oedipus solved the sphinx's riddle, accepted the throne, and unknowingly married his mother Jocasta, thereby fulfilling the second half of the prophecy. With Oedipus, Jocasta bore four children: Antigone, Ismene, Eteocles, and Polynices.

Differing stories exist concerning the latter part of Jocasta's life. In a retelling by Sophocles, Oedipus learned, when his city was struck by a plague, that it was divine punishment for his patricide and incest. Hearing this news, Jocasta hanged herself. However, in the version told by Euripides, Jocasta endured the burden of disgrace upon the discovery and continued to live in Thebes, only committing suicide (by hanging or stabbing) after she failed to reconcile Eteocles and Polynices and they killed each other in a fight for their father's crown. In both traditions, Oedipus blinds himself by gouging out his eyes, sometimes with Jocasta's brooches. Sophocles has Oedipus go into exile with his daughter Antigone, but Euripides and Statius have him residing within Thebes' walls during the war between Eteocles and Polynices.

After her death, Jocasta was seen by Odysseus during his journey through Hades.

=== Middle Age tradition ===
Jocasta is remembered in De Mulieribus Claris, a collection of biographies of historical and mythological women by the Florentine author Giovanni Boccaccio, composed in 1361–62. It is notable as the first collection devoted exclusively to biographies of women in Western literature.

== See also ==
- Oedipus Rex by Sophocles, an ancient Greek retelling of this legend as a play
- Oedipus, describing the life and cultural impact of the child in this legend
- Jocasta complex, describing the usually latent sexual desire that a mother has for a son. Or, alternatively, the domineering and intense but non-incestuous love that a mother has for an intelligent son; an often absent or weak father figure may be an element of this complex.
- Oedipus complex, a Freudian theory referring to a child's unconscious sexual desire for the opposite-sex parent and hatred for the same-sex parent
- Family romance, a Freudian theory whereby the young child or adolescent fantasizes that they are really the children of parents of higher social standing than their actual parents
