= Apollonides =

Apollonides was an ancient Greek male name.

- Apollonides of Smyrna or Apollonides Smyrnaeus, epigrammatist
- Apollonides of Sicyon fl. 186 BC, Achaean statesman
- Apollonides (physician), a physician who lived around the 1st or 2nd century
- Apollonides (governor of Argos), appointed by Cassander by 315 BC
- Apollonides of Boeotia, ancient Greek soldier, 5th century BC
- Apollonides of Cardia, contemporary of Philip of Macedonia
- Apollonides of Chios, chief of Persian guard in Chios at the time of Alexander the Great, 332 BC
- Apollonides of Cos, Greek physician of the 5th century BC, and a central character of Ctesias' history
- Apollonides of Nicaea, Greek grammarian of the time of Emperor Tiberius
- Apollonides (philosopher), stoic philosopher of the 1st century, friend of Cato the Younger
- Apollonides of Olynthus, a general in the time of Philip II of Macedon
- Apollonides of Orapius, ancient Greek writer who wrote a work on Egypt
- Apollonides of Sparta, treasurer of 2nd century BCE
- Apollonides of Syracuse, a notable citizen during the Second Punic War
- Apollonides (poet), tragic poet
