= Antigone (Sophocles play) =

Tragedy by Sophocles

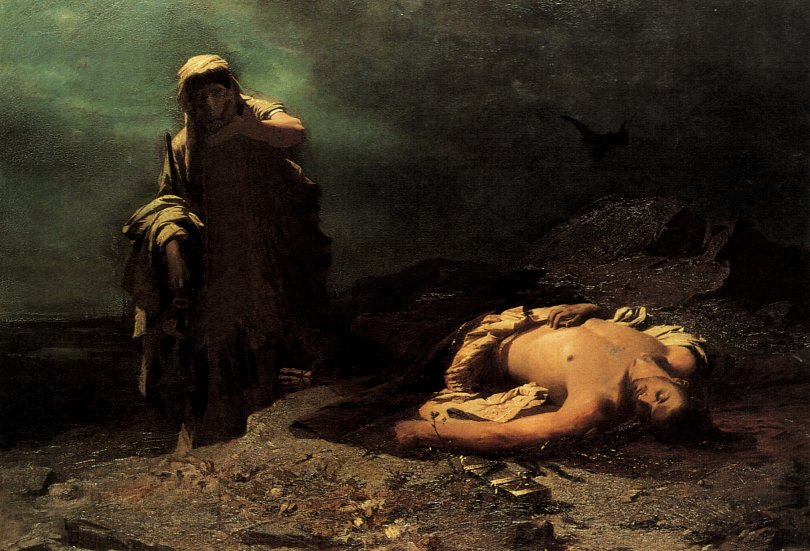
- Antigone in front of the dead Polynices by Nikiforos Lytras 1865
- Original language: Ancient Greek
- Written by: Sophocles
- Chorus: Theban Elders
- Characters: Antigone; Ismene; Creon; Eurydice; Haemon; Tiresias; Sentry; Leader of the Chorus; First Messenger; Second Messenger
- Mute: Two guards A boy
- Genre: Tragedy

Premiere
- Date: c. 441 BC
- Place: Athens

Antigone (/ænˈtɪɡəni/ ann-TIG-ə-nee; Ancient Greek: Ἀντιγόνη) is an Athenian tragedy written by Sophocles in either 442 or 440 BC and first performed at the Festival of Dionysus of the same year. It is thought to be the second-oldest surviving play of Sophocles, preceded by Ajax, which was written around the same period. The play is one of a triad of tragedies known as the three Theban plays, following Oedipus Rex and Oedipus at Colonus. Even though the events in Antigone occur last in the order of events depicted in the plays, Sophocles wrote Antigone first. The story expands on the Theban legend that predates it, and it picks up where Aeschylus' Seven Against Thebes ends. The play is named after the main protagonist Antigone.

After Oedipus' self-exile, his sons Eteocles and Polynices engaged in a civil war for the Theban throne, which resulted in both brothers dying while fighting each other. Oedipus' brother-in-law and new Theban ruler Creon ordered the public honoring of Eteocles and the public shaming of Thebes' traitor Polynices. The play follows the attempts of their sister Antigone to bury the body of Polynices, going against the decision of her uncle Creon and placing her relationship with her brother above human laws.

== Synopsis ==
Prior to the beginning of the play, the brothers Eteocles and Polynices, leading opposite sides in Thebes' civil war, died fighting each other for the throne. Creon, the new ruler of Thebes and brother of the former Queen Jocasta, has decided that Eteocles will be honored and Polynices will be in public shame. The rebel brother's body will not be sanctified by holy rites and will lie unburied on the battlefield, prey for carrion animals, (Note: As Teiresias later describes : "... the cities whose mangled sons had the burial-rite from dogs, or from wild beasts, or from some winged bird ...") the harshest punishment at the time. Antigone and Ismene are the sisters of the dead Polynices and Eteocles.

Laius
Oedipus
Eteocles	Polynices

Jocasta
Ismene

Creon	Eurydice
Antigone	Haemon

In the opening of the play, Antigone brings Ismene outside the palace gates late at night for a secret meeting: Antigone wants to bury Polynices' body, in defiance of Creon's edict, as the Greeks believed that the omission of proper burial rights is an insult to human dignity. Ismene refuses to help her, not believing that it will actually be possible to bury their brother, who is under guard, but she is unable to stop Antigone from going to bury her brother herself.

The Chorus, consisting of Theban elders, enter and cast the background story of the Seven against Thebes into a mythic and heroic context.

Creon enters and seeks the support of the Chorus in the days to come and, in particular, wants them to back his edict regarding the disposal of Polynices' body. The leader of the Chorus pledges his support out of deference to Creon. A sentry enters, fearfully reporting that the body has been given funeral rites and a symbolic burial with a thin covering of earth, though no one saw who actually committed the crime. Creon, furious, orders the sentry to find the culprit or face death himself; the sentry leaves.

The Chorus sings of the ingenuity of human beings; but adds that they do not wish to live in the same city as law-breakers.

The sentry returns, bringing Antigone with him. The sentry explains that the watchmen uncovered Polynices' body and then caught Antigone as she performed the funeral rituals. Creon questions her after sending the sentry away, and she does not deny what she has done. She argues unflinchingly with Creon about the immorality of the edict and the morality of her actions. Creon becomes furious, and seeing Ismene upset, thinks she must have known of Antigone's plan. He summons her. Ismene tries to confess falsely to the crime, wishing to die alongside her sister, but Antigone will not have it. Creon orders that the two women be imprisoned.

The Chorus sings of the troubles of the house of Oedipus.

Haemon, Creon's son, enters to pledge allegiance to his father, even though he is engaged to Antigone. He initially seems willing to forsake Antigone, but when he gently tries to persuade his father to spare Antigone, claiming that "under cover of darkness the city mourns for the girl", the discussion deteriorates, and the two men are soon bitterly insulting each other. When Creon threatens to execute Antigone in front of his son, Haemon leaves, vowing never to see Creon again.

The Chorus sings of the power of love.

Antigone is brought in under guard on her way to execution. She sings a lament. The Chorus compares her to the goddess Niobe, who was turned into a rock, and say it is a wonderful thing to be compared to a goddess. Antigone accuses them of mocking her.

Creon decides to spare Ismene and to bury Antigone alive in a cave. By not killing her directly, he hopes to pay minimal respects to the gods. She is brought out of the house, and this time, she is sorrowful instead of defiant. She expresses her regrets at not having married and dying for following the laws of the gods. She is taken away to her living tomb.

The Chorus encourages Antigone by singing of the great women of myth who suffered.

Tiresias, the blind prophet, enters. Tiresias warns Creon that Polynices should now be urgently buried because the gods are displeased, refusing to accept any sacrifices or prayers from Thebes. However, Creon accuses Tiresias of being corrupt. Tiresias responds that Creon will lose "a son of [his] own loins" for the crimes of leaving Polynices unburied and putting Antigone into the earth (he does not say that Antigone should not be condemned to death, only that it is improper to keep a living body underneath the earth). Tiresias also prophesies that all of Greece will despise Creon and that the sacrificial offerings of Thebes will not be accepted by the gods. The leader of the Chorus, terrified, asks Creon to take Tiresias' advice to free Antigone and bury Polynices. Creon assents, leaving with a retinue of men.

The Chorus delivers a choral ode to the god Dionysus.

A messenger enters to tell the leader of the Chorus that Haemon has killed himself. Eurydice, Creon's wife and Haemon's mother, enters and asks the messenger to tell her everything. The messenger reports that Creon saw to the burial of Polynices. When Creon arrived at Antigone's cave, he found Haemon lamenting over Antigone, who had hanged herself. Haemon unsuccessfully attempted to stab Creon, then stabbed himself. Having listened to the messenger's account, Eurydice silently disappears into the palace.

Creon enters, carrying Haemon's body. He understands that his own actions have caused these events and blames himself. A second messenger arrives to tell Creon and the Chorus that Eurydice has also killed herself. With her last breath, she cursed her husband for the deaths of her sons, Haemon and Megareus. Creon blames himself for everything that has happened, and, a broken man, he asks his servants to help him inside. The order he valued so much has been protected, and he is still the king, but he has acted against the gods and lost his children and his wife as a result. After Creon condemns himself, the leader of the Chorus closes by saying that although the gods punish the proud, punishment brings wisdom.

=== Characters ===
- Antigone, the oldest daughter of Oedipus, the exiled king of Thebes and queen Jocasta. Antigone is a sister of Polynices, Eteocles and Ismene. Compared with her docile sister, Antigone is portrayed as a heroine who recognizes her familial duty. Her dialogues with Ismene reveal her to be as stubborn as her uncle. She defies Creon's decree despite the consequences she may face, in order to honor her deceased brother Polynices.
- Ismene serves as a foil for Antigone, presenting the contrast in their respective responses to the royal decree. She is more lawful and obedient to authority than her sister and hesitates to bury Polynices because she fears Creon.
- Creon is the current King of Thebes, who views law as the guarantor of personal happiness. He can also be seen as a tragic hero, losing everything for upholding what he believes is right. Even when he is forced to amend his decree to please the gods, he first tends to the dead Polynices before releasing Antigone.
- Eurydice of Thebes is the Queen of Thebes and Creon's wife. She appears towards the end and only to hear confirmation of her son Haemon's death. In her grief, she dies by suicide, cursing Creon, whom she blames for her son's death.
- Haemon is the son of Creon and Eurydice, betrothed to Antigone. Proved to be more reasonable than Creon, he attempts to reason with his father for the sake of Antigone. However, when Creon refuses to listen to him, Haemon leaves angrily and shouts he will never see him again. He dies by suicide after finding Antigone dead.
- Koryphaios is the assistant to the King (Creon) and the leader of the Chorus. He is often interpreted as a close advisor to the King, and therefore a close family friend. This role is highlighted in the end when Creon chooses to listen to Koryphaios' advice.
- Tiresias is the blind prophet whose prediction brings about the eventual proper burial of Polynices. Portrayed as wise and full of reason, Tiresias attempts to warn Creon of his foolishness and tells him the gods are angry. He manages to convince Creon, but is too late to save the impetuous Antigone.
- The Chorus, a group of elderly Theban men, is at first deferential to the king. Their purpose is to comment on the action in the play and add to the suspense and emotions, as well as connecting the story to myths. As the play progresses they counsel Creon to be more moderate. Their pleading persuades Creon to spare Ismene. They also advise Creon to take Tiresias's advice.

== Historical context ==
Antigone was written at a time of national fervor. In 441/0 BCE, Sophocles was appointed as one of the ten strategoi to lead a military expedition against Samos. Kathrin Rosenfield notes that it is striking that a prominent play in a time of such imperialism contains little political propaganda, no impassioned apostrophe, and—with the exception of the epiklerate (the right of the daughter to continue her dead father's lineage) and arguments against anarchy—makes no contemporary allusion or passing reference to Athens. Rather than become sidetracked with the issues of the time, Antigone remains focused on the characters and themes within the play. It does, however, expose the dangers of the absolute ruler, or tyrant, in the person of Creon, a king to whom few will speak freely and openly their true opinions, and who therefore makes the grievous error of condemning Antigone, an act that he pitifully regrets in the play's final lines. Athenians, proud of their democratic tradition, would have identified his error in the many lines of dialogue which emphasize that the people of Thebes believe he is wrong, but have no voice to tell him so. Athenians would identify the folly of tyranny.

== Notable features ==
The Chorus in Antigone contrasts with the chorus in Aeschylus' Seven Against Thebes, the play of which Antigone is a continuation. In a scene modern scholars believe to have been written after Aeschylus's death in order to make it consonant with Sophocles's play, the chorus in Seven Against Thebes is largely supportive of Antigone's decision to bury her brother. Here, the chorus is composed of old men who are largely unwilling to see civil disobedience in a positive light. The chorus also represents a typical difference in Sophocles' plays from those of both Aeschylus and Euripides. A chorus of Aeschylus' almost always continues or intensifies the moral nature of the play, while one of Euripides' frequently strays far from the main moral theme. The chorus in Antigone lies somewhere in between; it remains within the general moral in the immediate scene, but allows itself to be carried away from the occasion or the initial reason for speaking.

== Significance and interpretation ==
Once Creon has discovered that Antigone buried her brother against his orders, the ensuing discussion of her fate is devoid of arguments for mercy because of youth or sisterly love from the Chorus, Haemon or Antigone herself. Most of the arguments to save her center on a debate over which course adheres best to strict justice.

Both Antigone and Creon claim divine sanction for their actions; but Tiresias the prophet supports Antigone's claim that the gods demand Polynices' burial. It is not until the interview with Tiresias that Creon transgresses and is guilty of sin. He had no divine intimation that his edict would be displeasing to the gods and against their will. He is here warned that it is, but he defends it and insults the prophet of the gods. This is his sin, and it is this that leads to his punishment. The terrible calamities that overtake Creon are not the result of his exalting the law of the state over the unwritten and divine law that Antigone vindicates, but are his intemperance that led him to disregard the warnings of Tiresias until it was too late. This is emphasized by the Chorus in the lines that conclude the play.

The German poet Friedrich Hölderlin, whose translation had a strong impact on the philosopher Martin Heidegger, brings out a more subtle reading of the play: he focuses on Antigone's legal and political status within the palace, her privilege to be the heiress (according to the legal instrument of the epiklerate) and thus protected by Zeus. According to the legal practice of classical Athens, Creon is obliged to marry his closest relative (Haemon) to the late king's daughter in an inverted marriage rite, which would oblige Haemon to produce a son and heir for his dead father in law. Creon would be deprived of grandchildren and heirs to his lineage – a fact that provides a strong realistic motive for his hatred against Antigone. This modern perspective has remained submerged for a long time.

Heidegger, in his essay, The Ode on Man in Sophocles' Antigone, focuses on the chorus' sequence of strophe and antistrophe that begins on line 278. His interpretation is in three phases: first to consider the essential meaning of the verse, and then to move through the sequence with that understanding, and finally to discern what was nature of humankind that Sophocles was expressing in this poem. In the first two lines of the first strophe, in the translation Heidegger used, the chorus says that there are many strange things on earth, but there is nothing stranger than man. Beginnings are important to Heidegger, and he considered those two lines to describe the primary trait of the essence of humanity within which all other aspects must find their essence. Those two lines are so fundamental that the rest of the verse is spent catching up with them. The authentic Greek definition of humankind is the one who is strangest of all. Heidegger's interpretation of the text describes humankind in one word that captures the extremes — deinotaton. Man is deinon in the sense that he is the terrible, violent one, and also in the sense that he uses violence against the overpowering. Man is twice deinon. In a series of lectures in 1942, Hölderlin's Hymn, The Ister, Heidegger goes further in interpreting this play, and considers that Antigone takes on the destiny she has been given, but does not follow a path that is opposed to that of the humankind described in the choral ode. When Antigone opposes Creon, her suffering the uncanny is her supreme action.

=== The problem of the second burial ===
An important issue still debated regarding Sophocles' Antigone is the problem of the second burial. When she poured dust over her brother's body, Antigone completed the burial rituals and thus fulfilled her duty to him. Having been properly buried, Polynices' soul could proceed to the underworld whether or not the dust was removed from his body. However, Antigone went back after his body was uncovered and performed the ritual again, an act that seems to be completely unmotivated by anything other than a plot necessity so that she could be caught in the act of disobedience, leaving no doubt of her guilt. More than one commentator has suggested that it was the gods, not Antigone, who performed the first burial, citing both the guard's description of the scene and the chorus's observation. It's possible, however, that Antigone not only wants her brother to have burial rites, but that she wants his body to stay buried. The guard states that after they found that someone covered Polynices' body with dirt, the birds and animals left the body alone (lines 257–258). But when the guards removed the dirt, then the birds and animals returned, and Tiresias emphasizes that birds and dogs have defiled the city's altars and hearths with the rotting flesh from Polynices' body; as a result of which the gods will no longer accept the people's sacrifices and prayers (lines 1015–1020). It's possible, therefore, that after the guards remove the dirt protecting the body, Antigone buries him again to prevent the offense to the gods. Even though Antigone has already performed the burial rite for Polynices, Creon, on the advice of Tiresias (lines 1023–1030), makes a complete and permanent burial for his body.

Richard C. Jebb suggests that the only reason for Antigone's return to the burial site is that the first time she forgot the Choaí (libations), and "perhaps the rite was considered completed only if the Choaí were poured while the dust still covered the corpse."

Gilbert Norwood explains Antigone's performance of the second burial in terms of her stubbornness. His argument says that had Antigone not been so obsessed with the idea of keeping her brother covered, none of the deaths of the play would have happened. This argument states that if nothing had happened, nothing would have happened, and does not take much of a stand in explaining why Antigone returned for the second burial when the first would have fulfilled her religious obligation, regardless of how stubborn she was. This leaves that she acted only in passionate defiance of Creon and respect to her brother's earthly vessel.

Tycho von Wilamowitz-Moellendorff justifies the need for the second burial by comparing Sophocles' Antigone to a theoretical version where Antigone is apprehended during the first burial. In this situation, news of the illegal burial and Antigone's arrest would arrive at the same time and there would be no period of time in which Antigone's defiance and victory could be appreciated.

J. L. Rose maintains that the problem of the second burial is solved by close examination of Antigone as a tragic character. Being a tragic character, she is completely obsessed by one idea, and for her this is giving her brother his due respect in death and demonstrating her love for him and for what is right. When she sees her brother's body uncovered, therefore, she is overcome by emotion and acts impulsively to cover him again, with no regards to the necessity of the action or its consequences for her safety.

Bonnie Honig uses the problem of the second burial as the basis for her claim that Ismene performs the first burial, and that her pseudo-confession before Creon is actually an honest admission of guilt.

== Themes ==
=== Civil disobedience ===
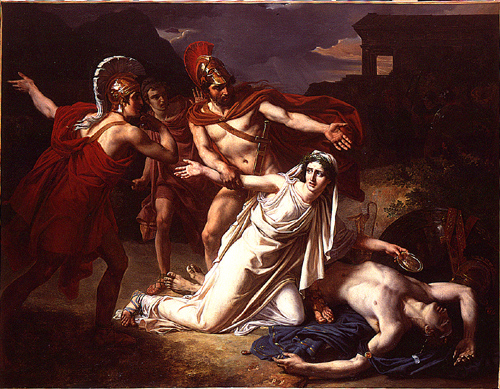
Antigone being captured and arrested for the burial of her brother, Polynices. Sébastien Norblin, 1825.

A well established theme in Antigone is the right of the individual to reject society's infringement on one's freedom to perform a personal obligation. Antigone comments to Ismene, regarding Creon's edict, that "He has no right to keep me from my own." Related to this theme is the question of whether Antigone's will to bury her brother is based on rational thought or instinct, a debate whose contributors include Goethe.

The contrasting views of Creon and Antigone with regard to laws higher than those of state inform their different conclusions about civil disobedience. Creon demands obedience to the law above all else, right or wrong. He says that "there is nothing worse than disobedience to authority" (An. 671). Antigone responds with the idea that state law is not absolute, and that it can be broken in civil disobedience in extreme cases, such as honoring the gods, whose rule and authority outweigh Creon's.

=== Natural law and contemporary legal institutions ===
Creon's decree to leave Polynices unburied in itself makes a bold statement about what it means to be a citizen, and what constitutes abdication of citizenship. It was the firmly kept custom of the Greeks that each city was responsible for the burial of its citizens. Herodotus discussed how members of each city would collect their own dead after a large battle to bury them. In Antigone, it is therefore natural that the people of Thebes did not bury the Argives, but very striking that Creon prohibited the burial of Polynices. Since he is a citizen of Thebes, it would have been natural for the Thebans to bury him. Creon is telling his people that Polynices has distanced himself from them, and that they are prohibited from treating him as a fellow-citizen and burying him as is the custom for citizens.

In prohibiting the people of Thebes from burying Polynices, Creon is essentially placing him on the level of the other attackers—the foreign Argives. For Creon, the fact that Polynices has attacked the city effectively revokes his citizenship and makes him a foreigner. As defined by this decree, citizenship is based on loyalty. It is revoked when Polynices commits what in Creon's eyes amounts to treason. When pitted against Antigone's view, this understanding of citizenship creates a new axis of conflict. Antigone does not deny that Polynices has betrayed the state, she simply acts as if this betrayal does not rob him of the connection that he would have otherwise had with the city. Creon, on the other hand, believes that citizenship is a contract; it is not absolute or inalienable, and can be lost in certain circumstances. These two opposing views – that citizenship is absolute and undeniable and alternatively that citizenship is based on certain behavior – are known respectively as citizenship 'by nature' and citizenship 'by law.'

=== Fidelity ===
Antigone's determination to bury Polynices arises from a desire to bring honor to her family, and to honor the higher law of the gods. She repeatedly declares that she must act to please "those that are dead" (An. 77), because they hold more weight than any ruler, that is the weight of divine law. In the opening scene, she makes an emotional appeal to her sister Ismene saying that they must protect their brother out of sisterly love, even if he did betray their state. Antigone believes that there are rights that are inalienable because they come from the highest authority, or authority itself, that is the divine law.

While he rejects Antigone's actions based on family honor, Creon appears to value family himself. When talking to Haemon, Creon demands of him not only obedience as a citizen, but also as a son. Creon says "everything else shall be second to your father's decision" (An. 640–641). His emphasis on being Haemon's father rather than his king may seem odd, especially in light of the fact that Creon elsewhere advocates obedience to the state above all else. It is not clear how he would personally handle these two values in conflict, but it is a moot point in the play, for, as absolute ruler of Thebes, Creon is the state, and the state is Creon. It is clear how he feels about these two values in conflict when encountered in another person, Antigone: loyalty to the state comes before family fealty, and he sentences her to death.

=== Portrayal of the gods ===
In Antigone as well as the other Theban Plays, there are very few references to the gods. Hades is the god who is most commonly referred to, but he is referred to more as a personification of Death. Zeus is referenced a total of 13 times by name in the entire play, and Apollo is referenced only as a personification of prophecy. This lack of mention portrays the tragic events that occur as the result of human error, and not divine intervention. The gods are portrayed as chthonic, as near the beginning there is a reference to "Justice who dwells with the gods beneath the earth." Sophocles references Olympus twice in Antigone. This contrasts with the other Athenian tragedians, who reference Olympus often.

=== Equity ===
Following in the Aristotelian tradition, Antigone is also seen as a case-study for equity. Catharine Titi has likened Antigone's 'divine' law to modern peremptory norms of customary international law (ius cogens) and she has discussed Antigone's dilemma as a situation that invites the application of equity contra legem in order to correct the law.

== Modern adaptations ==
=== Drama ===
- Felix Mendelssohn composed a suite of incidental music for Ludwig Tieck's staging of the play in 1841. It includes an overture and seven choruses.
- Walter Hasenclever wrote an adaptation in 1917, inspired by the events of World War I.
- Jean Cocteau created an adaptation of Sophocles' Antigone at Théâtre de l'Atelier in Paris on December 22, 1922.
- French playwright Jean Anouilh's tragedy Antigone was inspired by both Sophocles' play and the myth itself. Anouilh's play premièred in Paris at the Théâtre de l'Atelier in February 1944, during the Nazi occupation of France.
- Shortly after World War II, Bertolt Brecht composed an adaptation, Antigone, which was based on a translation by Friedrich Hölderlin and was published under the title Antigonemodell 1948.
- The Haitian writer and playwright Félix Morisseau-Leroy translated and adapted Antigone into Haitian Creole under the title, Antigòn (1953). Antigòn is noteworthy in its attempts to insert the lived religious experience of many Haitians into the content of the play through the introduction of several Loa from the pantheon of Haitian Vodou as voiced entities throughout the performance.
- Antigone inspired the 1967 Spanish-language novel La tumba de Antígona (English title: Antigone's Tomb) by María Zambrano.
- Puerto Rican playwright Luis Rafael Sánchez's 1968 play La Pasión según Antígona Pérez sets Sophocles' play in a contemporary world where Creon is the dictator of a fictional Latin American nation, and Antígona and her 'brothers' are dissident freedom fighters.
- The Island, a 1973 apartheid-era play by the South African playwrights Athol Fugard, John Kani, and Winston Nthsona, features two cellmates who rehearse and ultimately perform Antigone for the other prisoners, drawing parallels between Antigone herself and black political prisoners held in Robben Island prison.
- In 1977, Antigone was translated into Papiamento for an Aruban production by director Burny Every together with Pedro Velásquez and Ramon Todd Dandaré. This translation retains the original iambic verse by Sophocles.
- Antigona Furiosa, written in the period of 1985-86 by Griselda Gambaro, is an Argentinian drama heavily influenced by Antigone by Sophocles, and comments on an era of government terrorism that later transformed into the Dirty War of Argentina.
- Bangladeshi director Tanvir Mokammel in his 2008 film Rabeya (The Sister) also draws inspiration from Antigone to parallel the story to the martyrs of the 1971 Bangladeshi Liberation War who were denied a proper burial.
- In 2000, Peruvian theatre group Yuyachkani and poet José Watanabe adapted the play into a one-actor piece that remains as part of the group's repertoire.
- In 2004 the National Asian American Theater Company staged a production where Mia Katigbak played the ruler Creon.
- In 2004, theatre companies Crossing Jamaica Avenue and The Women's Project in New York City co-produced the Antigone Project written by Tanya Barfield, Karen Hartman, Chiori Miyagawa, Pulitzer Prize winner Lynn Nottage and Caridad Svich, a five-part response to Sophocles' text and to the US Patriot Act. The text was published by NoPassport Press as a single edition in 2009 with introductions by classics scholar Marianne McDonald and playwright Lisa Schlesinger.
- An Iranian absurdist adaptation of Antigone was written and directed by Homayoun Ghanizadeh and staged at the City Theatre in Tehran in 2011.
- In 2012, the Royal National Theatre adapted Antigone to modern times. Directed by Polly Findlay, the production transformed the dead Polynices into a terrorist threat and Antigone into a "dangerous subversive."
- Roy Williams's 2014 adaptation of Antigone for the Pilot Theatre relocates the setting to contemporary street culture.
- Syrian playwright Mohammad Al-Attar adapted Antigone for a 2014 production at Beirut, performed by Syrian refugee women.
- Antigone in Ferguson is an adaptation conceived in the wake of the shooting of Michael Brown by police in 2014, through a collaboration between Theater of War Productions and community members from Ferguson, Missouri. Translated and directed by Theater of War Productions Artistic Director Bryan Doerries and composed by Phil Woodmore.
- Elena Carapetis' rewritten version, described as a response to the original, portrays a feminist theme. It was produced by the State Theatre Company of South Australia in Adelaide in June 2022, directed by Anthony Nicola.
- Antigone in the Amazon (premiered March 2023), a performance that combines storytelling, music, and film to create a political performance, by Belgian theatre-maker Milo Rau.
- Antigone (This Play I Read in High School) by Anna Ziegler premiered at The Public Theater in 2026, framing the story in a more modern Thebes as re-told by a woman in twenty-first-century America
- A modernised version by Lulu Raczka, starring Eilidh Loan and Holly Howden Gilchrist, took place in 2026 at the Tron Theatre in Glasgow.
- Antigone: In the Language of Kings is a reimagining of the story set in pre-conquest Tenochtitlan, Mexico, adapted by Evelina Fernández. It debuted as a co-production from the Getty Villa and Latino Theater Company in the fall of 2026. The play features a blend of English, Spanish, and Nahuatl dialogue.

=== Opera ===
- Antigone, opera by Arthur Honegger, premiered on December 28, 1927, at Théâtre de la Monnaie in Bruxelles.
- Antigonae, opera by Carl Orff, a Literaturoper, which uses Friedrich Hölderlin's translation of Sophokles' drama (1805), premiered on August 8, 1949, at the Felsenreitschule in the context of Salzburg Festival.
- Antigone (1977) by Dinos Constantinides, on an English libretto by Fitts and Fitzgerald
- Antigone (1986) by Marjorie S. Merryman
- Antigone oder die Stadt (1988) by Georg Katzer with a libretto by Gerhard Müller, premiered at the Komische Oper Berlin in 1991, staged by Harry Kupfer and conducted by Jörg-Peter Weigle
- The Burial at Thebes (2007–2008) by Dominique Le Gendre and libretto by Seamus Heaney, based on his translation for spoken theatre. The production features conductor William Lumpkin, stage director Jim Petosa, and six singers and ten instrumentalists.
- Antigone (2020) oratory composed by Samy Moussa with stage direction and choreography by Nanine Linning, premiered on March 9, 2024 at the Dutch National Opera & Ballet in conjunction with Stravinsky’s Oedipus Rex (1927)

=== Literature ===
Sara Uribe's Antígona González, a book of prose set in Tamaulipas, Mexico exploring violent and fatal effects of the drug war, draws heavily on Antigone to reflect everyone in Latin America searching for the missing loved one.

In 2017 Kamila Shamsie published Home Fire, which transposes some of the moral and political questions in Antigone into the context of Islam, ISIS and modern-day Britain.

2023 saw bestselling author Veronica Roth publish a speculative fiction version of Antigone, Arch-Conspirator, which explores concepts of gender equity, reproductive rights, and the loss of freedoms under self-righteous tyranny.

=== Cinema ===
George Tzavellas adapted the play into a 1961 film, which he also directed. It featured Irene Papas as Antigone.

Liliana Cavani's 1969 The Year of the Cannibals is a contemporary political fantasy based upon the Sophocles play, with Britt Ekland as Antigone and Pierre Clémenti as Tiresias.

The 1978 omnibus film Germany in Autumn features a segment by Heinrich Böll entitled "The Deferred Antigone" where a fictional production of Antigone is presented to television executives who reject it as "too topical".

In 1992, Jean-Marie Straub and Danièle Huillet made a film adaptation based on Brecht’s stage version of Hölderlin’s translation — Die Antigone des Sophokles nach der Hölderlinschen Übertragung für die Bühne bearbeitet von Brecht (1948).

A 2019 Canadian film adaption transposed the story into one of a modern-day immigrant family in Montreal. It was adapted and directed by Sophie Deraspe, with additional inspiration from the Death of Fredy Villanueva. Antigone was played by Nahéma Ricci.

=== Television ===
Vittorio Cottafavi directed two television productions of the play, in 1958 for RAI Radiotelevisione Italiana and in 1971 for Rai 1. Valentina Fortunato and Adriana Asti, respectively, performed the title role.

It was filmed for Australian TV in 1966.

In 1986, Juliet Stevenson starred as Antigone, with John Shrapnel as Creon and John Gielgud as Tiresias in the BBC's The Theban Plays.

Antigone at the Barbican was a 2015 filmed-for-TV version of a production at the Barbican directed by Ivo van Hove; the translation was by Anne Carson and the film starred Juliette Binoche as Antigone and Patrick O'Kane as Kreon.

Other TV adaptations of Antigone have starred Irene Worth (1949) and Dorothy Tutin (1959), both broadcast by the BBC.

== Translations and adaptations ==
- 1550 – Georgio Rotallero: text in Latin
- 1729 – George Adams, prose: full text
- 1782 – Vittorio Alfieri, in hendecasyllables: text in Italian
- 1839 – Johann Jakob Christian Donner, German verse
- 1865 – Edward H. Plumptre, verse (full text on Wikisource, with audio)
- 1883 – Lewis Campbell, verse (full text on Wikisource)
- 1888 – Sir George Young, verse (Dover, 2006; ISBN 978-0486450490)
- 1899 – G. H. Palmer, verse (Boston: Houghton and Mifflin, 1899)
- 1904 – Richard C. Jebb, prose: (full text on Wikisource)
- 1911 – Joseph Edward Harry, verse (Cincinnati: Robert Clarke, 1911) (full text on Wikisource)
- 1912 – F. Storr, verse: full text
- 1926 – Ettore Romagnoli, in hendecasyllables, text in Italian
- 1931 – Shaemas O'Sheel, prose
- 1938 – Dudley Fitts and Robert Fitzgerald, verse: full text
- 1946 – Jean Anouilh, (modern French translation)
- 1947 – E. F. Watling, verse (Penguin classics)
- 1949 – Robert Whitelaw, verse (Rinehart Editions)
- 1950 – Theodore Howard Banks, verse
- 1950 – W. J. Gruffydd (translation into Welsh)
- 1953 – Félix Morisseau-Leroy (translated and adapted into Haitian Creole)
- 1954 – Elizabeth Wyckoff, verse
- 1954 – F. L. Lucas, verse translation
- 1956 – Shahrokh Meskoob (into Persian)
- 1958 – Paul Roche, verse
- 1962 – H. D. F. Kitto, verse
- 1962 – Michael Townsend, (Longman, 1997; ISBN 978-0810202146)
- 1973 – Richard Emil Braun, verse
- 1982 – Robert Fagles, verse with introduction and notes by Bernard Knox
- 1986 – Don Taylor, prose (The Theban Plays, Methuen Drama; ISBN 978-0413424600)
- 1991 – David Grene, verse
- 1994 – Hugh Lloyd-Jones, verse (Sophocles, Volume II: Antigone, The Women of Trachis, Philoctetes, Oedipus at Colonus, Loeb Classical Library No. 21, 1994; ISBN 978-0674995581)
- 1997 – George Judy, adaptation for children (Pioneer Drama, 1997)
- 1998 – Ruby Blondell, prose with introduction and interpretive essay (Focus Classical Library, Focus Publishing/R Pullins Company; ISBN 0941051250)
- 1999 – Declan Donnellan, with introduction by Nicholas Dromgoole (Oberon Books, 1999; ISBN 978-1840021363)
- 2000 – Marianne MacDonald, (Nick Hern Books, 2000; ISBN 978-1854592002)
- 2001 – Paul Woodruff, verse (Hackett, 2001; ISBN 978-0-87220-571-0)
- 2003 – Reginald Gibbons and Charles Segal, verse (Oxford UP, 2007; ISBN 978-0195143102)
- 2004 – Seamus Heaney, The Burial at Thebes – verse adaptation (Farrar, Straus and Giroux, 2005; ISBN 978-0374530075), also adapted as an opera in 2008
- 2005 – Ian C. Johnston, verse (modern English): full text
- 2006 – George Theodoridis, prose: full text
- 2006 – A. F. Th. van der Heijden, 'Drijfzand koloniseren' ("Colonizing quicksand"), prose, adapting Antigone's story using characters from the author's 'Homo Duplex' saga.
- 2009 – Tanya Barfield, Karen Hartman, Lynn Nottage, Chiori Miyagawa, Caridad Svich, play adaptation (NoPassport Press, 2009; ISBN 978-0578031507)
- 2011 – Diane Rayor, Sophocles' Antigone: A New Translation. Cambridge University Press.
- 2012 – Anne Carson, play adaptation (Antigonick, New Directions Press; ISBN 978-0811219570)
- 2013 – George Porter, verse ("Black Antigone: Sophocles' tragedy meets the heartbeat of Africa", ISBN 978-1909183230)
- 2014 – Marie Slaight and Terrence Tasker, verse and art (The Antigone Poems, Altaire Productions; ISBN 978-0980644708)
- 2016 – Frank Nisetich
- 2016 – Slavoj Žižek, with introduction by Hanif Kureishi, Bloomsbury, New York
- 2017 – Kamila Shamsie, Home Fire, novel. An adaptation in a contemporary context, London: Bloomsbury Circus. ISBN 978-1408886779
- 2017 – Brad Poer, Antigone: Closure, play adaptation (contemporary American prose adaptation set post-fall of United States government)
- 2017 – Griff Bludworth, ANTIGONE (born against). A contemporary play adaptation that addresses the theme of racial discrimination.
- 2017 – Seonjae Kim, Riot Antigone. A punk rock musical adaptation inspired by the Riot grrrl movement that focuses on Antigone's coming of age.
- 2019 – Niloy Roy, Antigone: Antibody, play adaptation (contemporary Indian adaptation set in post-anarchic context of conflict between state and individual)
- 2019 – Sophie Deraspe, Antigone
- 2019 – Beth Piatote, Antíkoni, a modern Indigenous (specifically Nez Perce) play adaptation, published in The Beadworkers (CounterPoint Press, ISBN 978-1640092686)
- 2023 – Edward Alexander, Antigone,, verse, Invictus Publishing, ISBN 979-8393254292
- 2026 – Madelyn Mackintosh & Caroline Little, Antigone, produced by McGill University. A contemporary play adaptation set amid the rising authoritarianism of the 1930s.
