= Hegelochus =

Hegelochus or Hegelochos may refer to:

- Hegelochus of Macedon (4th century BC), a Macedonian general and admiral of Alexander the Great
- Hegelochus (actor) (5th century BC), Athenian tragic actor whose pronunciation was mocked by Sannyrion and other poets
- Hegelochus (Macedonian general) (4th century BC) - see Apollonides of Chios
