= Oedipus at Colonus =

Ancient Greek tragedy by Sophocles

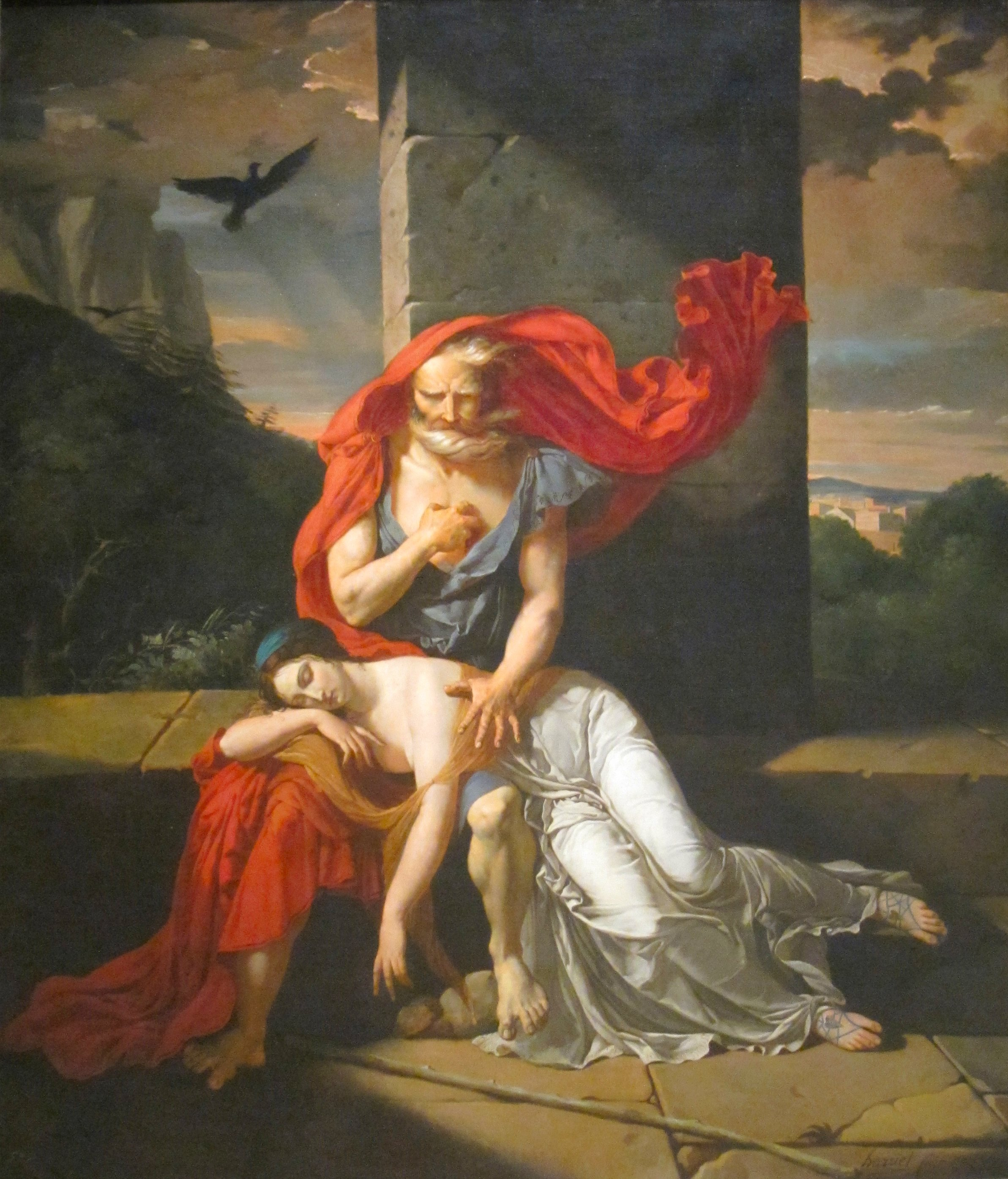
- Oedipus at Colonus by Fulchran-Jean Harriet
- Original language: Ancient Greek
- Written by: Sophocles
- Chorus: Elders of Colonus
- Characters: Oedipus; Antigone; Man from Colonus; Ismene; Theseus; Creon; Polynices; Messenger
- Genre: Tragedy
- Setting: In front of the grove of the Erinyes

Premiere
- Date: 401 BC
- Place: Athens

Oedipus at Colonus (also Oedipus Coloneus; Ancient Greek: Οἰδίπους ἐπὶ Κολωνῷ, Oidipous epi Kolōnō) is the second of the three Theban plays of the Athenian tragedian Sophocles. It was written shortly before Sophocles's death in 406 BC and produced by his grandson (also called Sophocles) at the Festival of Dionysus in 401 BC.

In the timeline of the plays, the events of Oedipus at Colonus occur after Oedipus Rex and before Antigone; however, it was the last of Sophocles's three Theban plays to be written. The play describes the end of Oedipus's tragic life. Legends differ as to the site of Oedipus's death; Sophocles set the place at Colonus, a village near Athens and also Sophocles's own birthplace, where the blinded Oedipus has come with his daughters Antigone and Ismene as suppliants of the Erinyes and of Theseus, the king of Athens.

== Plot ==
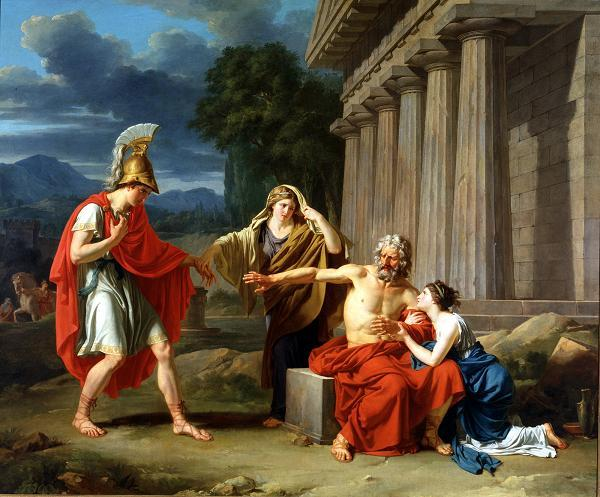
Oedipus at Colonus, Jean-Antoine-Théodore Giroust, 1788, Dallas Museum of Art

Led by Antigone, Oedipus enters the village of Colonus, where Theseus is king, and sits down on a stone. They are approached by a villager, who demands that they leave, because that ground is sacred to the Furies, or the Erinyes. Oedipus recognizes this as a sign, for when he received the prophecy that he would kill his father and marry his mother, Apollo also revealed to him that at the end of his life he would die at a place sacred to the Furies and be a blessing for the land in which he is buried.

The chorus, consisting of old men from the village, enters and persuades Oedipus to leave the holy ground. They then question him about his identity and are horrified to learn that he is the son of Laius. Although they promised not to harm Oedipus, they wish to expel him from their city, fearing that he will curse it. Oedipus answers by explaining that he is not morally responsible for his crimes, since he killed his father in self-defense. Furthermore, he asks to see their king, Theseus, saying, "I come as someone sacred, someone filled with piety and power, bearing a great gift for all your people." The chorus is amazed and decides to reserve their judgment of Oedipus until Theseus arrives.

Ismene arrives on horseback, rejoicing to see her father and sister. She brings the news that Eteocles has seized the throne of Thebes from his elder brother, Polynices, while Polynices is gathering support from the Argives to attack the city. Both sons have heard from an oracle that the outcome of the conflict will depend on where their father is buried. Ismene tells her father that it is Creon's plan to come for him and bury him at the border of Thebes, without proper burial rites, so that the power which the oracle says his grave will have will not be granted to any other land. Hearing this, Oedipus curses both of his sons for not treating him well, contrasting them with his devoted daughters. He pledges allegiance with neither of his feuding sons, but with the people of Colonus, who thus far have treated him well, and further asks them for protection from Creon.

Because Oedipus trespassed on the holy ground of the Eumenides, the villagers tell him that he must perform certain rites to appease them. Ismene volunteers to go perform them for him and departs, while Antigone remains with Oedipus. Meanwhile, the chorus questions Oedipus once more, desiring to know the details of his incest and patricide. After he relates his sorrowful story to them, Theseus enters, and in contrast to the prying chorus states, "I know all about you, son of Laius." He sympathizes with Oedipus and offers him unconditional aid, causing Oedipus to praise Theseus and offer him the gift of his burial site, which will ensure victory in a future conflict with Thebes. Theseus protests, saying that the two cities are friendly, and Oedipus responds with what is perhaps the most famous speech in the play. "Oh Theseus, dear friend, only the gods can never age, the gods can never die. All else in the world almighty Time obliterates, crushes all to nothing..." Theseus makes Oedipus a citizen of Athens and leaves the chorus to guard him as he departs. The chorus sings about the glory and beauty of Athens.

Creon, who is the representative of Thebes, comes to Oedipus and feigns pity for him and his children, telling him that he should return to Thebes. Oedipus is disgusted by Creon's duplicity and recounts all of the harms Creon has inflicted on him. Creon becomes angry and reveals that he has already captured Ismene; he then instructs his guards to forcibly seize Antigone. His men begin to carry them off toward Thebes, perhaps planning to use them as blackmail to get Oedipus to follow, out of a desire to return Thebans to Thebes, or simply out of anger. The chorus attempts to stop him, but Creon threatens to use force to bring Oedipus back to Thebes. The chorus then calls for Theseus, who comes from sacrificing to Poseidon to condemn Creon, telling him, "You have come to a city that practices justice, that sanctions nothing without law." Creon replies by condemning Oedipus, saying "I knew [your city] would never harbor a father-killer...worse, a creature so corrupt, exposed as the mate, the unholy husband of his own mother." Oedipus, infuriated, declares once more that he is not morally responsible for what he did. Theseus leads Creon away to retake the two girls. The Athenians overpower the Thebans and return both girls to Oedipus. Oedipus moves to kiss Theseus in gratitude, then draws back, acknowledging that he is still polluted.

Theseus then informs Oedipus that a suppliant has come to the temple of Poseidon and wishes to speak with him; it is Oedipus's son Polynices, who has been banished from Thebes by his brother Eteocles. Oedipus does not want to talk to him, saying that he loathes the sound of his voice, but Antigone persuades him to listen, saying, "Many other men have rebellious children, quick tempers too...but they listen to reason, they relent." Oedipus gives in to her, and Polynices enters, lamenting Oedipus's miserable condition and begging his father to speak to him. He tells Oedipus that he has been driven out of Thebes unjustly by his brother and that he is preparing to attack the city. He knows that this is the result of Oedipus's curse on his sons and begs his father to relent, even going so far as to say to his father, "We share the same fate." Oedipus tells him that he deserves his fate, for he cast his father out. He foretells that his two sons will kill each other in the coming battle. "Die! Die by your own blood brother's hand—die!—killing the very man who drove you out! So I curse your life out!" Antigone tries to restrain her brother, telling him that he should refrain from attacking Thebes and avoid dying at his brother's hand. Refusing to be dissuaded, Polynices exits.

Following their conversation, there is a fierce thunderstorm, which Oedipus interprets as a sign from Zeus of his impending death. Calling for Theseus, he tells him that it is time for him to give the gift he promised to Athens. Filled with strength, the blind Oedipus stands and walks, calling for his children and Theseus to follow him.

A messenger enters and tells the chorus that Oedipus is dead. He led his children and Theseus away, then bathed himself and poured libations while his daughters grieved. He told them that their burden of caring for him was lifted and asked Theseus to swear not to forsake his daughters. Then he sent his children away, for only Theseus could know the place of his death and pass it on to his heir. When the messenger turned back to look at the spot where Oedipus last stood, he says, "We couldn't see the man—he was gone—nowhere! And the king, alone, shielding his eyes, both hands spread out against his face as if some terrible wonder flashed before his eyes and he, he could not bear to look." Theseus enters with Antigone and Ismene, who are weeping and mourning their father. Antigone longs to see her father's tomb, even to be buried there with him rather than live without him. The women beg Theseus to take them, but he reminds them that the place is a secret and that no one may go there. "And he said that if I kept my pledge, I'd keep my country free of harm forever." Antigone agrees and asks for passage back to Thebes, where she hopes to stop the Seven against Thebes from marching. Everyone exits toward Athens.

== Analysis and themes ==
There is less action in this play than in Oedipus Rex, and more philosophical discussion. Here, Oedipus discusses his fate as related by the oracle, and claims that he is not fully guilty because his crimes of murder and incest were committed in ignorance. Despite being blinded and exiled and facing violence from Creon and his sons, in the end Oedipus is accepted and absolved by Zeus.

=== Historical context ===
In the years between the play's composition and its first performance, Athens underwent many changes. Defeated by the Spartans, the city was placed under the rule of the Thirty Tyrants, and the citizens who opposed their rule were exiled or executed. This certainly affected the way that early audiences reacted to the play, just as the invasion of Athens and its diminished power surely affected Sophocles as he wrote it.

The play contrasts the cities of Athens and Thebes quite sharply. Thebes is often used in Athenian dramas as a city in which proper boundaries and identities are not maintained, allowing the playwright to explore themes like incest, murder, and hubris in a safe setting.

=== Fate ===
While the two other plays about Oedipus often bring up the theme of a person's moral responsibility for their destiny, and whether it is possible to rebel against destiny, Oedipus at Colonus shows Oedipus's resolution of the problem. In Oedipus Rex, he was told by Tiresias, "You bear your fate and I will bear mine," a message repeated by the Chorus, but scorned by Oedipus, who like his father has believed he can escape his fate. In Oedipus at Colonus, he declares that even though fate, which literally means "necessity" in ancient Greek, is something we must suffer as beyond our choice in its power of necessity and is not a person's creation, we must also find a way to work with it. The key line in the play is when Oedipus declares, "Let us not fight necessity," and Antigone adds, "For you will never see in all the world a man whom God has let escape his destiny!"

=== Guilt ===
Oedipus at Colonus suggests that, in breaking divine law, a ruler's limited understanding may lead him to believe himself fully innocent; however, his lack of awareness does not change the objective fact of his guilt.

The presented view of determination of guilt is complex, as illustrated by the dichotomy between the blessing and the curse upon Oedipus. He has committed two crimes that render him a sort of monster and outcast among men: incest and patricide. His physical suffering, including his self-inflicted blindness and lonely wandering, is his 'punishment'. In the play Oedipus is "rationally innocent" – that he sinned unknowingly – which decreases his guilt, allowing his earthly sufferings to serve as sufficient expiation for his sins. In death, he will be favored; the place in which he dies will be blessed.

=== A possible heroic interpretation of Oedipus ===
Darice Birge has argued that Oedipus at Colonus can be interpreted as a heroic narrative of Oedipus rather than a tragic one. It can be viewed as developing a transition from the Oedipus of Oedipus Rex whose acts were abominable enough to make him a pollution to his city, to an Oedipus whose presence is so powerful a blessing that it is sought after by both Thebes and Athens. The major image used to show this transition from exile to hero is Oedipus's relationship with the sacred grove of the Erinyes. At the beginning of the play, Oedipus has to be led through the grove by Antigone and is only allowed to go through it because as a holy place it is an asylum for beggars. He recognizes the grove as the location once described to him in a prophecy as his final resting place. When Elders come looking for him, Oedipus enters the grove. This act, according to Birge, is his first act as a hero. He has given up his habit of trying to oppose divine will (as was his wont in Oedipus Rex) and prophecies, and accepts this grove as the place of his death. Oedipus then hints at the divine gift that is his body, which will bring success to those who accept him and suffering to those who turned him away. When Oedipus's daughter Ismene arrives, she brings news that Thebes, the city that once exiled Oedipus as a pollution, wants him back as a blessing. Ismene assists Oedipus's transformation into a hero when she performs a ritual atonement to the Erinyes on his behalf, but his status is fully cemented when he chooses a hidden part of the sacred grove as his final resting place, which even his daughters are forbidden to know.

== English-language translations ==
- George Adams, 1729 – prose
- Thomas Francklin, 1759 – verse: full text
- Edward Plumptre, 1878 – verse: (full text available at Wikisource)
- Lewis Campbell, 1883 – verse (full text at Wikisource, rev. edition of 1906)
- Richard Claverhouse Jebb, 1904 – prose: (full text, with audio, available at Wikisource)
- Francis Storr, 1912 – verse: (full text, with audio, available at Wikisource)
- W. B. Yeats, 1934 – mixed prose and verse
- Robert Fitzgerald, 1940 – verse
- E. F. Watling, 1947 – verse
- Gilbert Murray, 1948 – verse: full text
- Theodore Howard Banks, 1953 – verse
- Paul Roche, 1958 – verse
- Robert Fagles, 1984 – verse
- Don Taylor, 1986 – prose
- Carl R. Mueller and Anna Krajewska Wieczorek, 2000 – verse
- Ruby Blondell, 2002 – verse
- Eamon Grennan and Rachel Kitzinger, 2004 – verse
- David R. Slavitt, 2007 – verse
- George Theodoridis, 2009 – prose: full text
- Ian C. Johnston, 2015 – verse full text
- Frank Nisetich, 2016 – verse

== Adaptations ==
- Œdipe à Colone, 1786 opera by Antonio Sacchini
- Edipo a Colono, 1817 incidental music by Gioachino Rossini for Sophocles' play
- Ödipus in Kolonos, 1845 incidental music by Felix Mendelssohn for Sophocles' play
- Ioannis Gryparis' Broadway adaptation, 1976, with Alexis Minotis as Oedipus
- Don Taylor's 1986 television adaptation starring Anthony Quayle and Juliet Stevenson
- Lee Breuer and Bob Telson, The Gospel at Colonus, 1986
- Patrick Stewart and Tim Philip-Smith, BBC radio 4 play
- Justin Fleming, Child of the Dark Sun, 2016

== Bibliography ==
- Andreas Markantonatos. Tragic Narrative: A Narratological Study of Sophocles' Oedipus at Colonus. Walter de Gruyter, 2002. ISBN 3110895889
- Jebb, Sir Richard Claverhouse, ed. (1889). Sophocles: The Plays and Fragments with Critical Notes, Commentary, and Translation in English Prose. Part II. The Oedipus Coloneus (2nd ed.). Cambridge University Press.
- Kaggelaris, Nikos (2016). "Ο Οιδίπους του Σοφοκλή στη Μήδεια του Μποστ" [Sophocles' Oedipus in Bost's Medea] [in Greek] in Mastrapas, A. N. – Stergioulis, M. M. (eds.) Σοφοκλής ο μεγάλος κλασικός της τραγωδίας [Seminar 42: Sophocles the great classic of tragedy], Athens: Koralli, pp. 74–81 ISBN 978-960-9542-46-3

== See also ==
- Antinatalism
