= Antigone (Mendelssohn) =

Suite of incidental music by Felix Mendelssohn to Sophocles' play

- Incidental music by Felix Mendelssohn
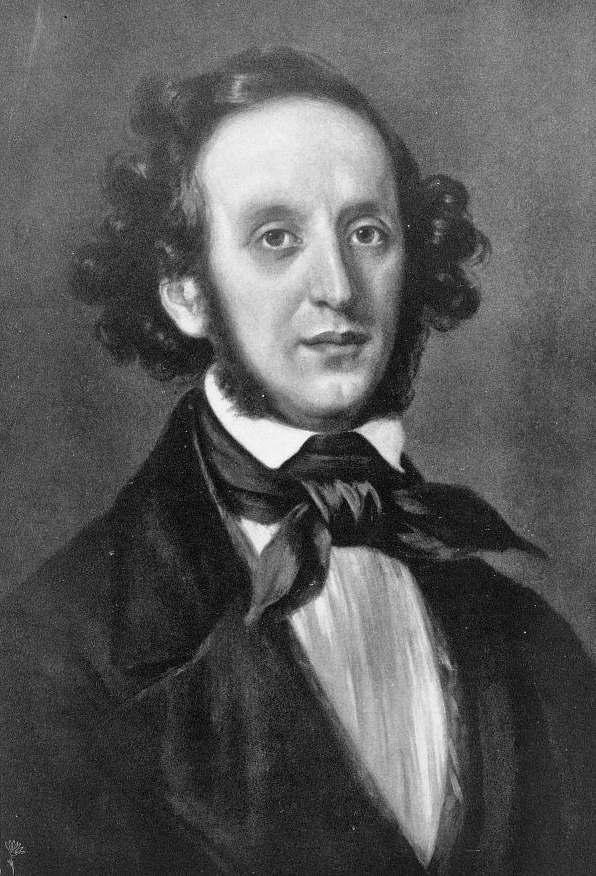
- The composer in 1845, portrayed by Eduard Magnus
- Opus: 55
- Text: from Johann Jakob Christian Donner's translation
- Language: German
- Based on: Antigone
- Dedication: Frederick William IV of Prussia
- Performed: 28 October 1841: Potsdam
- Published: 1841
- Movements: 8
- Scoring: narrators; tenor and bass soloists; two men's choirs; orchestra

Antigone, Op. 55, MWV M 12, is a suite of incidental music written in 1841 by Felix Mendelssohn to accompany the tragedy Antigone by Sophocles, staged by Ludwig Tieck. The text is based on Johann Jakob Christian Donner's German translation of the text, with additional assistance from August Böckh.

The music is scored for narrators, tenor and bass soloists, two men's choirs and orchestra. It includes an overture and seven choruses. The choruses are set in the style of Greek chorus, with strophes and antistrophes sung antiphonally by the two choirs, with additional passages of recitative.

The first performance took place at the New Palace, Potsdam on 28 October 1841. A public performance followed a week later at the Berlin State Opera on 6 November 1841. The music was published that year by Kistner in Leipzig, with a dedication to his patron, King Frederick William IV of Prussia.

== Background ==
Mendelssohn had been appointed as court composer to Frederick William IV, who had ascended the throne in June the previous year. The king had encountered Donner's translation of the play and passed it on to Tieck, the Vorleser (stage reader) of the court. Mendelssohn composed the music quickly. Tieck first mentioned the idea on September 9, 1841, and the first full stage rehearsal was six weeks later.

Sophocles' play includes an initial choral ode and five stasima. Mendelssohn added an additional ode at the end, drawing on the final dialogue between the chorus and Creon for the text.

Overture (C minor)

1. "Strahl des Helios, schönstes Licht" (C major)
2. "Vieles Gewaltige lebt" (A major)
3. "Ihr Seligen, deren Geschick nie kostet' Unheil!" (F major)
4. "O Eros, Allsieger im Kampf" (G major)
5. "Noch toset des Sturmes Gewalt" (E minor)
6. Bacchus-Chor: "Vielnamiger! Wonn' und Stolz der Kadmos-Jungfrau" (D major)
7. "Hier kommt er ja selbst" (E flat major)

== Analysis ==
The text setting, while of Donner's German translation, works well with the original Greek as well, suggesting that Mendelssohn must also have been attentive to the Greek text. Initially, Mendelssohn had attempted to imitate what he believed ancient Greek music to sound like, using mainly unison recitative and using only instruments that would have been known to the Greeks, but abandoned the idea.

Michael Steinberg has cautioned about the complexity of interpreting Antigone, given that the production was not strictly speaking Mendelssohn's plan, but a group effort involving the king, Tieck, Donner, as well as Mendelssohn. He further noted that Tieck staged the play in a way that reflected his interpretation of the play as presaging Christianity, which had complex resonances with Mendelssohn's Jewish background.

== Reception ==
The music enjoyed immediate success in Germany.

The play with the music was performed at the Royal Opera House, Covent Garden, London, on 2 January 1845, conducted by George Alexander Macfarren, with less success. The awkward appearance of the chorus in this staging was satirized in the January 18 issue of Punch. Thomas de Quincey, writing after the same production was given in Edinburgh, was also critical of Mendelssohn's music, saying that "in quest of a thing called Greek music" he was guilty of "voluntarily abandoning the resources of his own genius".

Mendelssohn himself was pleased with his music and it remained meaningful to him until the end of his life. At his funeral in 1847, an excerpt of it was played.

== Selected recordings ==
- Berlin Radio Symphony Orchestra conducted by Stefan Soltesz, Capriccio (1995)
- Frankfurt Radio Symphony Orchestra conducted by Othmar Mága, Audite
