= Orestes (play) =

Ancient Greek play by Euripides

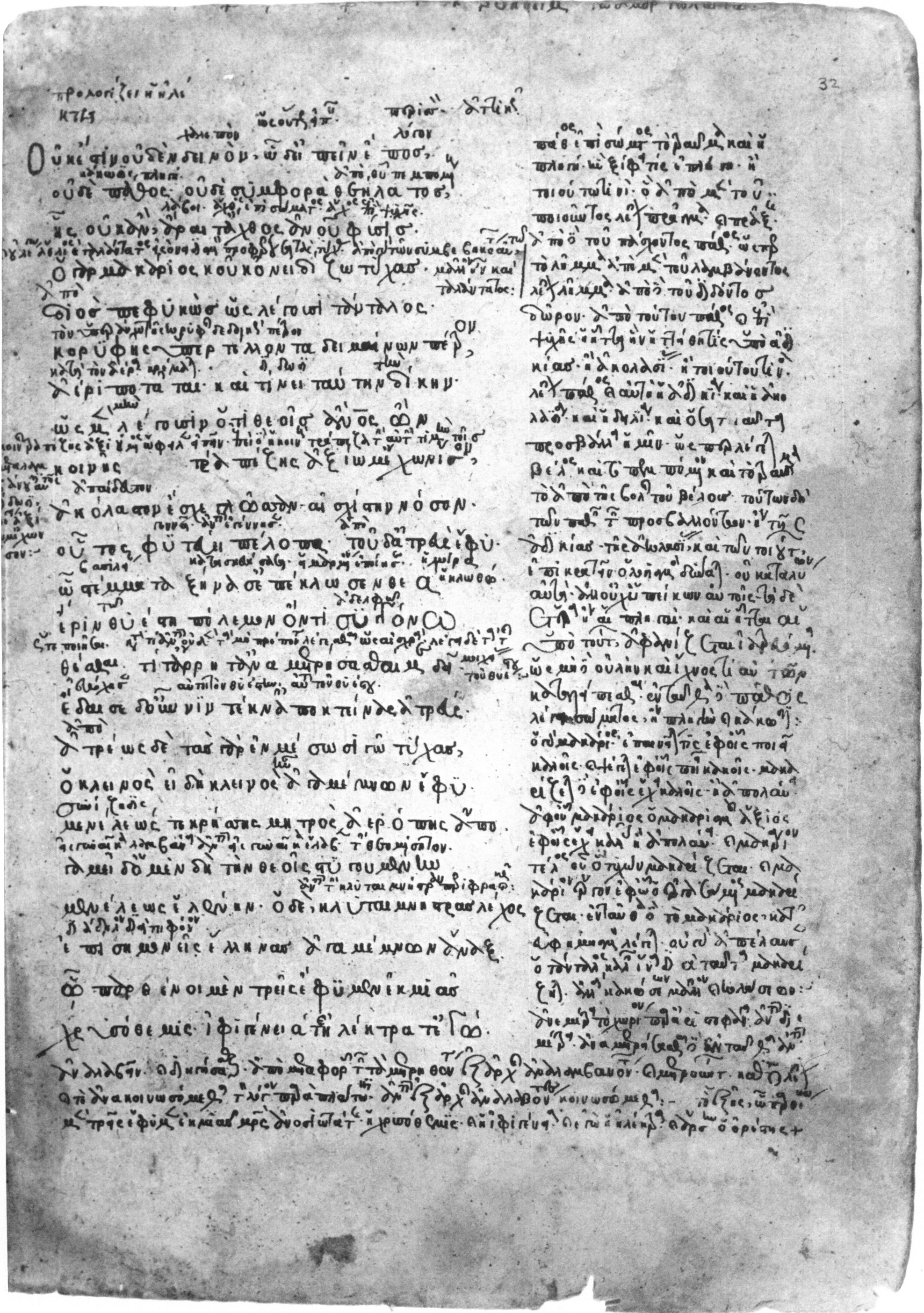
- Euripides, Orestes, Oxford, MS. Barocci 120, fol. 32r (early 14th century)
- Original language: Ancient Greek
- Written by: Euripides
- Chorus: Argive Maidens
- Characters: Electra; Helen; Orestes; Menelaus; Pylades; Messenger; Hermione; Phrygian Eunuch; Apollo; Tyndareus
- Genre: Tragedy
- Setting: before the Palace of Argos

Orestes (Ancient Greek: Ὀρέστης, Orestēs) (408 BCE) is an Ancient Greek play by Euripides that follows the events of Orestes after he had murdered his mother.

== Background ==
In accordance with the advice of the god Apollo, Orestes has killed his mother Clytemnestra to avenge the death of his father Agamemnon at her hands. Despite Apollo's earlier prophecy, Orestes finds himself tormented by Erinyes or Furies to the blood guilt stemming from his matricide. The only person capable of calming Orestes down from his madness is his sister Electra. To complicate matters further, a leading political faction of Argos wants to put Orestes to death for the murder. Orestes' only hope to save his life lies in his uncle Menelaus, who has returned with Helen after spending ten years in Troy and several more years amassing wealth in Egypt. In the chronology of events following Orestes, this play takes place after the events contained in plays such as Electra by Euripides and Sophocles or The Libation Bearers by Aeschylus, and before events contained in plays like Andromache by Euripides. Orestes presents a very different version of the myth which was also depicted by Aeschylus in The Eumenides.

== Plot ==
The play begins with a soliloquy that outlines the basic plot and events that have led up to this point from Electra, who stands next to a sleeping Orestes. Shortly after, Helen comes out of the palace under the pretext that she wishes to make an offering at her sister Clytemnestra's grave. After Helen leaves, a chorus of Argive women enters to help advance the plot. Then Orestes, still maddened by the Furies, awakes.

Menelaus arrives at the palace, and he and Orestes discuss the murder and the resulting madness. Tyndareus, Orestes' grandfather and Menelaus' father-in-law comes onto the scene and roundly chastises Orestes, leading to a conversation with the three men on the role of humans in dispensing divine justice and natural law. As Tyndareus leaves, he warns Menelaus that he will need the old man as an ally. Orestes, in supplication before Menelaus, hopes to gain the compassion that Tyndareus would not grant in an attempt to get him to speak before the assembly of Argive men. However, Menelaus ultimately shuns his nephew, choosing not to compromise his tenuous power among the Greeks, who blame him and his wife for the Trojan War.

Pylades, Orestes' life-long friend and his accomplice in Clytemnestra's murder, arrives after Menelaus has exited. He and Orestes begin to formulate a plan, in the process indicting partisan politics and leaders who manipulate the masses for results contrary to the best interest of the state. Orestes and Pylades then exit so that they may state their case before the town assembly in an effort to save Orestes and Electra from execution, which proves unsuccessful. The off-stage assembly-scene (reported by a messenger) is immensely detailed, containing speeches from four different speakers as well as Orestes himself.

Their execution certain, Orestes, Electra, and Pylades formulate a plan of revenge against Menelaus for turning his back on them. To inflict the greatest suffering, they plan to kill Helen and hold her daughter, Hermione, hostage in order to escape harm. However, when they go to kill Helen, she vanishes. In attempting to execute their plan, a Phrygian slave of Helen's escapes the palace. Orestes asks the slave why he should spare his life, and the slave supplicates himself before Orestes. Orestes is won over by the Phrygian's argument that, like free men, slaves prefer the light of day to death. Menelaus then enters leading to a standoff between him and Orestes, Electra, and Pylades, who have successfully captured Hermione.

Just as more bloodshed is to occur, Apollo arrives on stage deus ex machina. He sets everything back in order, explaining that he has rescued Helen to place her among the stars, and that Menelaus must go back to Sparta. He tells Orestes to go to Athens to the Areopagus, the Athenian court, in order to stand judgment, where he will later be acquitted. Also, Orestes is to marry Hermione, while Pylades will marry Electra. Finally, Apollo tells the mortals to go and rejoice in Peace, most honored and favored of the gods.

== Themes ==
Aeschylus' play Eumenides, the third part of his surviving Oresteia trilogy, enshrines the trial and acquittal of Orestes within the foundation of Athens itself, as a moment when legal deliberation surpassed blood vengeance as a means of resolution. As such, the fact that Euripides' version of the myth portrays Orestes being found guilty and resorts to bloodshed and blackmail to escape has been interpreted as deeply problematic for Athenian identity.

It has been argued by some authors that Euripides uses the mythology of the Bronze Age to make a political point about the politics of Classical Athens during the Peloponnesian War. Orestes first played at the Dionysia during the waning years of the war, both Athens and Sparta and all of their allies had suffered tremendous losses.

Euripides challenges the role of the gods and perhaps more appropriately man's interpretation of divine will. Orestes and others note the subordinate role of man to the gods, but the superiority of the gods does not make them particularly fair or rational.

William Arrowsmith praised the play as a sharp condemnation of Athenian society, calling it:

[T]ragedy utterly without affirmation, an image of heroic action seen as botched, disfigured, and sick, carried along by the machinery and slogans of heroic action in a steady crescendo of biting irony and rage of exposure. It is ... a kind of negative tragedy of total turbulence, deriving its real power from the exposure of the aching disparity between the ideal and the real, dooming all possibility of order and admitting dignity only as the agonizing absence by which the degree of depravity is to be judged.

Arrowsmith also wrote, "I am tempted to see in the play Euripides' prophetic image of the final destruction of Athens and Hellas, or that Hellas to which a civilized man could still give his full commitment."

In addition to the will of the gods, the role of natural law and its tension with man-made law is noted. For example, Tyndareus argues to Menelaus that the law is fundamental to men's lives, to which Menelaus counters that blind obedience to anything, such as the law, is an attribute of a slave.

Perhaps most important to the play is Apollo's closing statements that Peace is to be revered more than all other values. Orestes best embodies this value by sparing the life of the Phrygian, driving home the point the beauty of life transcends cultural boundaries whether one be a slave or free man. This was also the only successful supplication in the play. This point is of particular value, since the Peloponnesian War had already lasted nearly a quarter of a century by the time of this play's production.

== Production ==
The play debuted in Athens at the City Dionysia in 408 BC. At least one performance became known because of a mispronunciation by the actor Hegelochus, playing Orestes, which was lampooned by several poets. In line 279 of the play, instead of "after the storm I see again a calm sea" (γαλήν' ὁρῶ, galḗn' horô), Hegelochus recited "after the storm I see again a weasel" (γαλῆν ὁρῶ, galên' horô).

== Choral ode ==
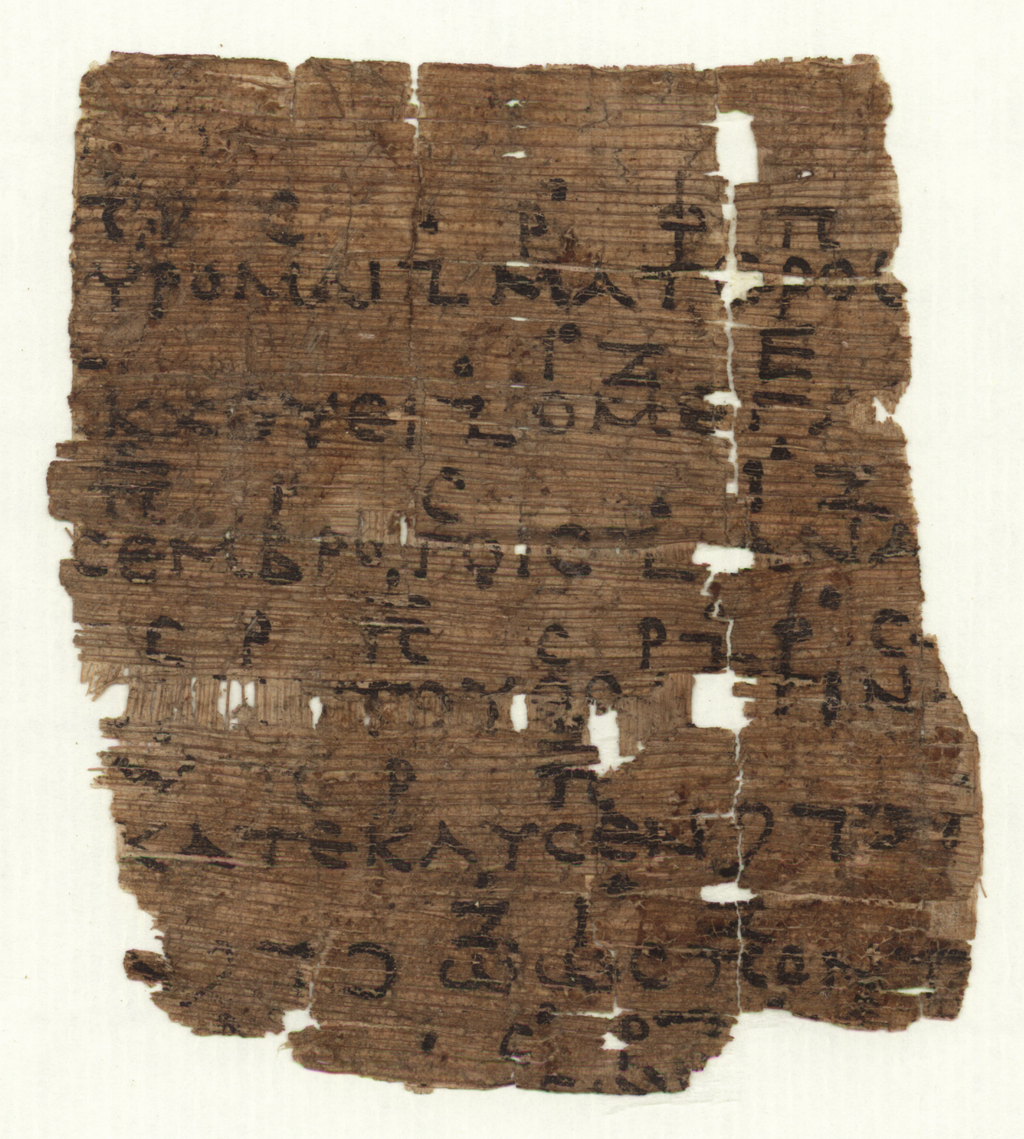
Musical fragment from the first stasimon (lines 338–344, Vienna Papyrus G 2315)

Vienna Papyrus G 2315 from Hermopolis, Egypt contains a choral ode with musical notation, possibly composed by Euripides himself.

== Translations ==
- Robert Potter, 1777
- Edward Philip Coleridge, 1891 – prose: full text
- Arthur S. Way, 1912 – verse
- William Arrowsmith, 1958 – verse: available for digital loan
- Andrew Wilson, 1994 – prose: full text
- Afsar Ahmed, 2001 – verse
- Helen Edmundson, 2006 – prose
- Anne Carson, 2009 – verse
- George Theodoridis, 2010 – prose: full text
- Ian C. Johnston, 2010 – verse: full text
- Brian Vinero, 2013: verse
