= Edipo a Colono (Rossini) =

Incidental music by Rossini

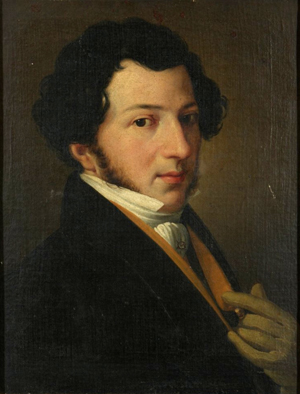
Gioachino Rossini as a young man, c. 1810–1815

Edipo a Colono is a piece of incidental music. Gioachino Rossini composed it in 1817 for bass voice, men's chorus and orchestra. The Italian libretto by Giambattista Giusti is based on the eponymous play by Sophocles.

Three excerpts were furnished with French lyrics and published in 1844: the choruses La Foi and l'Esperance, and the aria Ame innocent.

After a long absence, the 'Rossini renaissance' brought about a staged revival at the Rossini Opera Festival at Pesaro in 1982, and again in 1995, using the critical edition published by the Fondazione Rossini/Casa Ricordi edited by Lorenzo Tozzi and Piero Weiss.
