= Oedipus at Colonus (Mendelssohn) =

Incidental music by Felix Mendelssohn

Oedipus at Colonus (German: Ödipus in Kolonos), Op. 93 is incidental music by Felix Mendelssohn to Sophocles' play Oedipus at Colonus (401 BC) consisting of an orchestral introduction and nine scenes for two choirs and soloists. The work was commissioned by Frederick William IV of Prussia and in 1845 had its first performance in Potsdam at the Neues Palais. William's goal was to encourage the revival of Greek tragedy and classical works among Berlin audiences. Nine days later, on 10 November 1845 the work received its first public performance. The work takes about 50 to 60 minutes to play.

During its time, the work was very successful and received many performance within Germany and abroad. It is also regarded as one of Mendelssohn's most popular works.

== Scoring ==
The work is written for two voices, a double male chorus, and orchestra of fifteen instruments:

- flute
- oboe
- clarinet
- bassoon
- cornet
- trombone
- timpani
- violin
- viola
- contrabass

== Recordings ==
- 1993: René Pape (bass), actors Therese Hämer, Franziska Pigulla, Klaus Piontek, Otto Sander, Gunter Schoß, Wolfgang Unterzaucher; Berlin Radio Symphony Orchestra, Berlin Radio Choir, Carl Maria von Weber Men's Choir, Stefan Soltész; Capriccio 10393
- 2010: Manfred Bittner (bass), actors Angela Winkler, Joachim Kuntzsch, Julia Nachtmann, Michael Ransburg; Klassische Philharmonie Stuttgart, Kammerchor Stuttgart, Frieder Bernius; Carus CAR83225
