= Johann Jakob Christian Donner =

German classical philologist and translator (1799–1875)

Johann Jakob Christian Donner (Krefeld, 10 October 1799 – Stuttgart, 28 March 1875) was a German classical philologist and translator.

He studied theology and philology at the University of Tübingen. Beginning in 1823, he was associated with the Protestant seminary in Urach. In 1827 he was named professor at the upper gymnasium in Ellwangen, and from 1843 to 1852, was a professor at the upper gymnasium in Stuttgart.

His main work was a translation of the plays by Sophocles, which he published in between 1838 and 1839 (8th edition, 1875). This translation formed the basis for Felix Mendelssohn's incidental music Antigone (1841). Donner was also responsible for providing translations of works by Euripides, Aeschylus, Pindar, Aristophanes, Terence, Plautus, and Homer (Iliad and Odyssey).

== Bibliography ==
- Karl August Klüpfel (1877). "Donner, Johann Jakob Christian" . Allgemeine Deutsche Biographie (in German). Vol. 5. Leipzig: Duncker & Humblot. pp. 333–334.
