= Chaeron of Sparta =

Lacedaemonian demagogue and tyrant of Sparta

Chaeron (Ancient Greek: Χαίρων; also rendered as Charon) was a Lacedaemonian (Spartan) demagogue who briefly served as tyrant of Sparta in 180 BC.

He appears to have been associated with the party of Nabis; for he is found at Rome in 183 BC as the representative of those who had been banished or condemned to death by the Achaeans after they annexed Sparta in 192 BC. During his reign as tyrant, he squandered the public money and unjustly divided the lands. Apollonides and other treasurers were appointed to check the system of squandering the public money which had been carried by him. Chaeron feared Apollonides, and had him assassinated by his emissaries, for which he was brought to trial by the Achaeans and sent to prison.

In The Histories, Polybius writes:

He was a sharp and able man, but he was young and of humble station, and had received a vulgar education. This man, courting the mob and making innovations upon which no one else ventured, soon acquired some reputation with the populace.
