= Timon of Phlius =

Greek Pyrrhonist philosopher (c.320–c.235 BC)

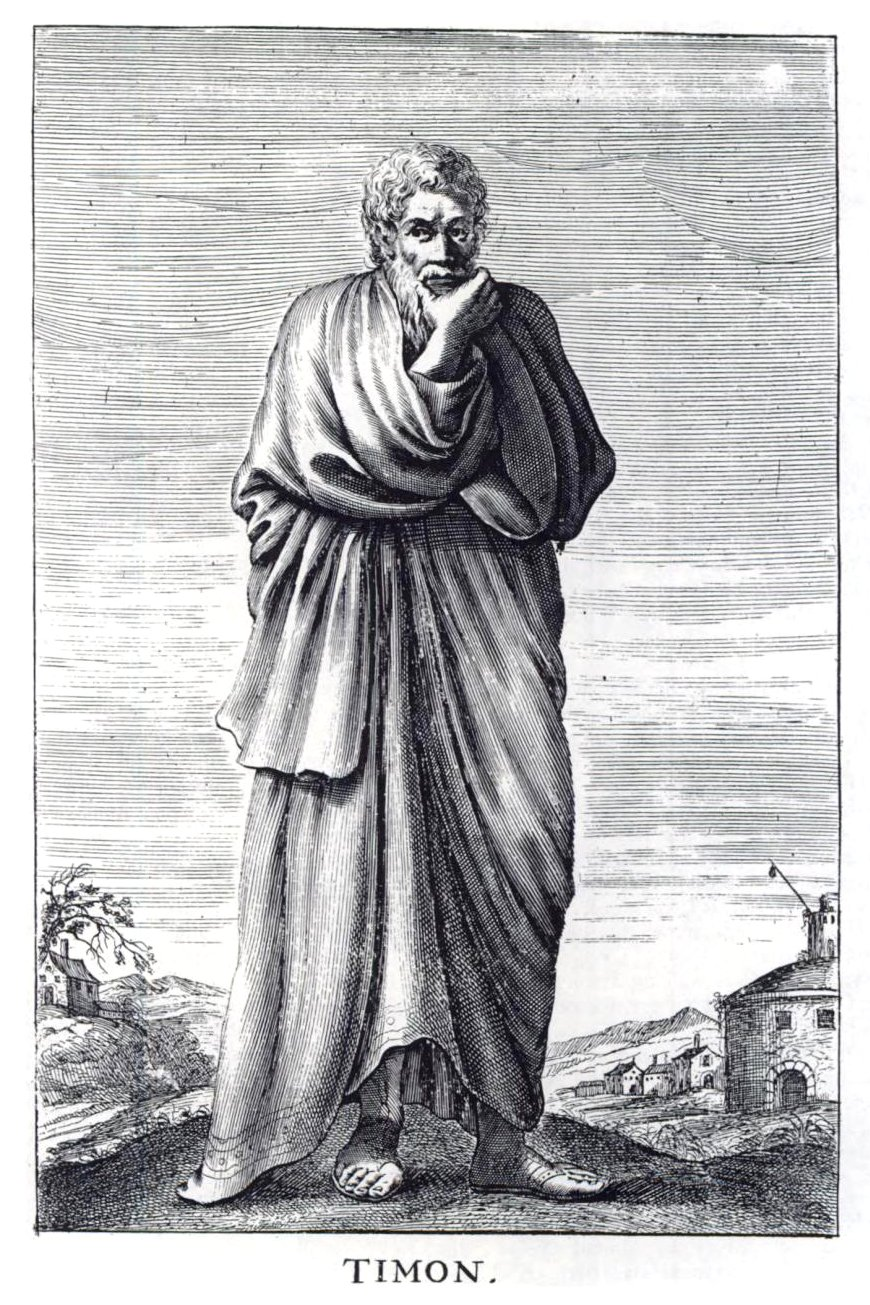
- Timon of Phlius, 17th-century engraving
- Born: c. 325-320 BCE; Phlius
- Died: c. 235-230 BCE (aged c. 90)

Philosophical work
- Era: Hellenistic philosophy
- Region: Western philosophy
- School: Skepticism
- Main interests: Epistemology

Timon of Phlius (/ˈtiː.mɔːn/; Ancient Greek: Τίμων ὁ Φλιάσιος, romanized: Tímōn ho Phliásios, gen. Τίμωνος, Tímōnos; c. 320 BC – c. 235 BC) was an Ancient Greek philosopher from the Hellenistic period, who was the student of Pyrrho. Unlike Pyrrho, who wrote nothing, Timon wrote satirical philosophical poetry called Silloi (Σίλλοι) as well as a number of prose writings. These have been lost, but the fragments quoted in later authors allow a rough outline of his philosophy to be reconstructed.

== Life ==
The primary source for Timon's biography is the account in Diogenes Laërtius, which claims to be taken from earlier authors such as Apollonides of Nicaea, Antigonus of Carystus, and Sotion, whose works have now been lost. According to Diogenes, Timon was born in Phlius, and was at first a dancer in the theatre, but he abandoned this profession for the study of philosophy, and, having moved to Megara, he spent some time with Stilpo, returned home to marry, and then moved to Elis with his wife, and heard Pyrrho, whose tenets he adopted. Driven again from Elis by straitened circumstances, he spent some time on the Hellespont and the Propontis, and taught at Chalcedon as a sophist with such success that he made a fortune. He then moved to Athens, where he lived until his death, with the exception of a short residence at Thebes. According to Diogenes he knew the kings Antigonus and Ptolemy II Philadelphus. The Suda also claims he was linked to several literary figures such as: Alexander Aetolus and Homerus, whom he is said to have assisted in the composition of their tragedies; and Aratus, whom he is said to have taught. He died at an age of almost ninety.

== Writings ==
According to Diogenes Laërtius, Timon composed "lyric and epic poems, and tragedies and satiric dramas, and thirty comedies, and sixty tragedies and the Silloi and amatory poems." The Silloi has not survived intact, but they are mentioned and quoted by several ancient authors. It has been suggested that Pyrrhonism ultimately originated with Timon rather than Pyrrho.

=== Silloi ===
The most celebrated of his poems were the satiric compositions called Silloi, a word of somewhat uncertain etymology, but which undoubtedly describes metrical compositions, of a character at once ludicrous and sarcastic. The invention of this species of poetry is ascribed to Xenophanes of Colophon. The Silloi of Timon were in three books, in the first of which he spoke in his own person, and the other two are in the form of a dialogue between the author and Xenophanes, in which Timon proposed questions, to which Xenophanes replied at length. The subject was a sarcastic account of the tenets of all philosophers, living and dead; an unbounded field for scepticism and satire. They were in hexameter verse, and, from the way in which they are mentioned by the ancient writers, as well as from the few fragments of them which have survived, it is evident that they were admirable productions of their kind. Commentaries were written on the Silloi by Apollonides of Nicaea, and also by Sotion of Alexandria.

=== Poetry ===
The poem entitled Images (Greek: Ἰνδαλμοι) in elegiac verse, appears to have been similar in its subject to the Silloi. Diogenes Laërtius also mentions Timon's iamboi, but perhaps the word is here merely used in the sense of satirical poems in general, without reference to the metre. According to Timon, philosophers are "excessively cunning murderers of many wise saws" (v. 96); the only two whom he spares are Xenophanes, "the modest censor of Homer's lies" (v. 29), and Pyrrho, against whom "no other mortal dare contend" (v. 126).

No remains of his dramas have survived. Of his epic poems little is known, but it may be presumed that they were chiefly ludicrous or satirical poems in the epic form. It appears probable that his Funeral Banquet of Arcesilaus was also a satirical poem in epic verse. He also wrote parodies on Homer, and some lines from a scepticism-themed poem in elegiac verse have been preserved, as well as one or two fragments which cannot be with certainty assigned to any of his poems.

=== Prose works ===
He also wrote in prose, to the quantity, according to Diogenes Laërtius, of twenty thousand lines. These works were no doubt on philosophical subjects, and Diogenes mentions On Sensations, On Inquiries, and Towards Wisdom. Also among his lost works is Against the Physicists, in which he questioned the legitimacy of making hypotheses. The longest surviving quote, preserved by Eusebius in Praeparatio evangelica quoting Aristocles is from his work Python (Greek: Πύθων), which contained a long account of a conversation with Pyrrho, during a journey to the Delphic oracle.:

'The things themselves are equally indifferent, and unstable, and indeterminate, and therefore neither our senses nor our opinions are either true or false. For this reason then we must not trust them, but be without opinions, and without bias, and without wavering, saying of every single thing that it no more is than is not, or both is and is not, or neither is nor is not.
