= Apollonides (poet) =

Ancient Greek tragic poet

Apollonides (Ancient Greek: Ἀπολλωνίδης) was a tragic poet of ancient Greece, concerning whom nothing is known. He may have lived in the third century BCE. Two fragments of his dramas (TrGF 152) are preserved by Clement of Alexandria and Stobaeus. He may have been the same person as Apollonides of Nicaea.
