= Orestes Papyrus =

Ancient Greek musical fragment

External videos
- Euripides - Stasimon ('Orestes')
- Euripedes, "Stasimon Chorus" from Orestes (enharmonic)
- Orestes Stasimon (Greek Lyre)
- Coro del Orestes de Eurípides

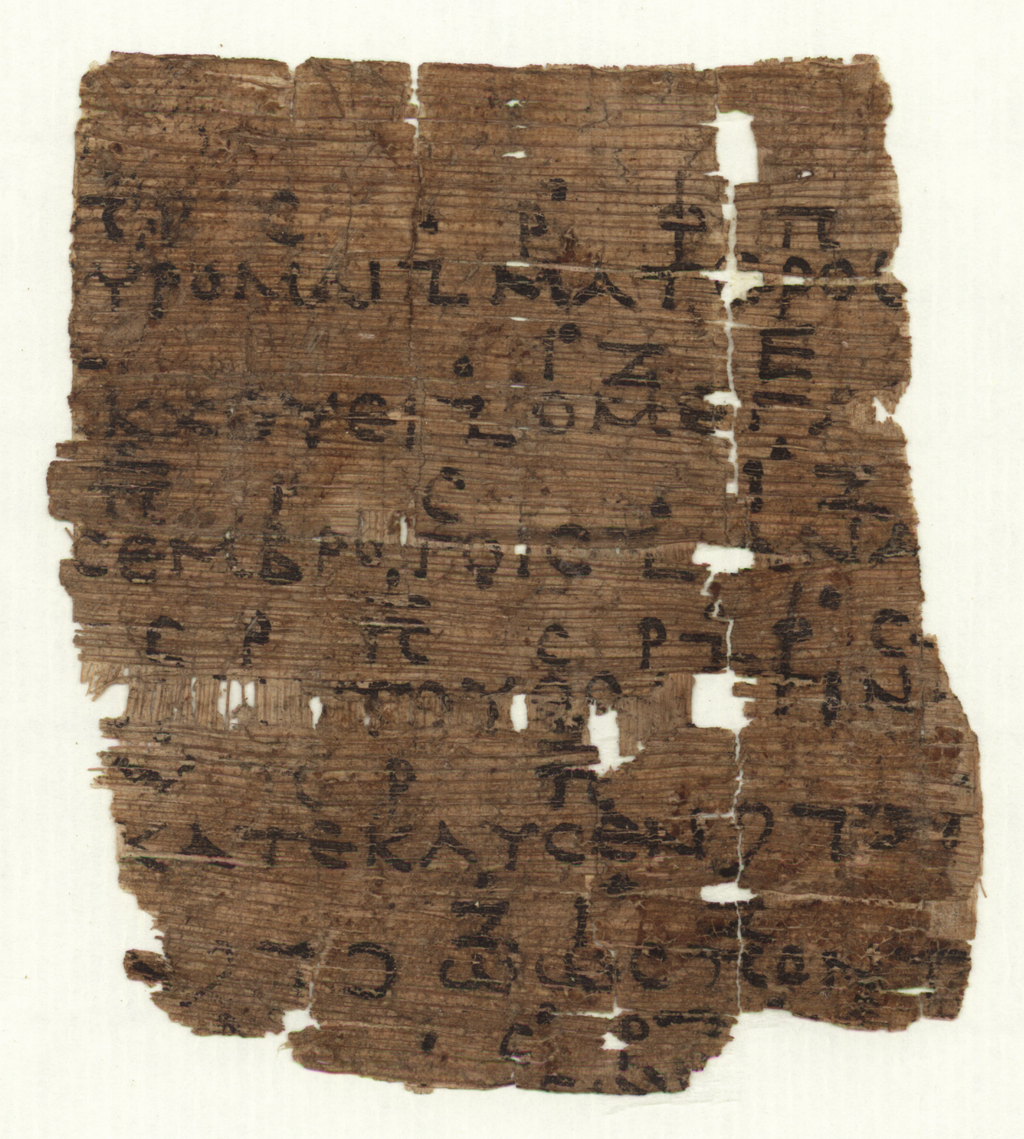
The Orestes Papyrus, dated to the third century BCE

The Orestes Papyrus (also known as Vienna Papyrus G 2315) is an Ancient Greek musical fragment with a portion of the first stasimon of Orestes by Euripides, found in Hermopolis, Egypt, and dated to the third century BCE. (Note: Mathiesen (1999) places it about 125 years after the death of Euripides.) It contains lines 338-344 of the stasimon and the musical notation for both the vocals and instruments, extremely rare in surviving Ancient Greek notation. Although the fragment dates to the third century BCE, the melody recorded on it may have been written much earlier, although whether or not the melody was composed by Euripides is an open question. It is the best surviving fragment of the play and the musical notation for it.

== Discovery ==
The fragment was discovered in the cartonnage of a mummy in Hermopolis, Egypt in the late 19th century. It was bought by Archduke Rainer Ferdinand of Austria among a number of other papyri in 1883, was later discovered in 1890, and was published by papyrologist Karl Wessely in 1892.

== Text ==
The full text of the fragment reads as follows:

[κατολοφύρομαι, κατολοφ]ύρομαι,
ματέρος [αἷμα σᾶς, ὅ σ’ ἀναβα]κχεύει,
ὁ μέγ[ας ὄλβος οὐ μόνιμο]ς ἐν βροτοῖς,
ἀνὰ [δὲ λαῖφος ὥς τις ἀκά]του θο[ᾶς] τιν[άξας δαίμων],
κατέκλυσεν [δεινῶν πόνων] ὡς πόντ[ου
λάβροις ὀλεθρίοισιν ἐν κύμασιν]

(I cry, I cry, your mother’s blood that drives you mad, great happiness in mortals never lasting, but like a sail of a swift ship, which a god shook up and plunged it with terrible troubles into the greedy and deadly waves of sea.)

The arrangement of the fragmentary text differs from traditional versions because the words "κατολοφύρομαι, κατολοφύρομαι" (''I cry, I cry'') come before the sentence "ματέρος αἷμα σᾶς, ὅ σ’ ἀναβακχεύει" (''your mother's blood that drives you mad''). Due to this, the lines could instead be read as "ματέρος αἷμα σᾶς, ὅ σ’ ἀναβακχεύει, κατολοφύρομαι, κατολοφύρομαι" (''your mother's blood that drives you mad, I cry, I cry''). This was likely a mistake from the scribe who copied the play.

== Poetic features ==
The metre of the song is mainly dochmiac. The preserved vocal notes coincide with the ancient Dorian or Phrygian harmoniai transmitted by Aristides Quintilianus, the Damonian harmoniai, in enharmonic genus, which was usual in tragedies from the fifth century BCE.

== Authorship ==
Whether this fragment represents the original music Euripides composed in 408 BCE is an open question, given the absence of fifth century BCE musical inscriptions. The fragment accords with observations by Dionysius of Halicarnassus and Aristophanes about the complexity of the Euripidean style.
