= Antígona González =

- First edition (Spanish)
- Author: Sara Uribe
- Translator: Jadine Pluecker
- Genre: Poetry, Prose, Literature
- Publisher: Sur+
- Publication date: 2012
- Publication place: Mexico
- English publication date: 2016
- Pages: 205
- ISBN: 978-1-934254-64-6

Antígona González is a book of prose that focuses on the fictional story of Antígona González's search for her missing brother, Tadeo. It is set in Tamaulipas, Mexico, the state with the highest number of missing persons reported in the nation. Commissioned by Sandra Muñoz to create a work that speaks out against the violence and death being caused by the drug war in Mexico, author Sara Uribe compiles newspaper articles, firsthand accounts, lines of poetry, and the ancient Greek myth of Antigone to represent the searches that many family members undergo for missing relatives.

== Synopsis ==
Antígona González, a young woman living in Tamaulipas, Mexico, discovers her brother Tadeo has disappeared, likely victim to the drug war going on in the country. She refers to herself and others in her situation as the “Antigones” of Mexico. Like Antigone of the Greek play, they are all in a desperate search to recover their lost loved ones.

Following Tadeo's abrupt disappearance, a distraught Antígona turns to her family for help in the search to find her brother. Instead, her family tells her not to go to the authorities or try to learn any information regarding his disappearance due to the threat posed by the narcos. Desperate, Antígona becomes of one of the many "Antigones" across Mexico, people who are continually searching, travelling, and seeking justice for Polynices: their missing loved one.

Antígona González's story about Tadeo is punctuated by accounts of other "Antigones," based on real disappearances in Mexico. The stories are of varying lengths, some of which are only a line or two long, and either detail a relative's efforts to recover a missing person or describe yet another dead Polynices found in Mexico from a newspaper article

Antígona has flashbacks, mourning Tadeo by recalling their childhood together. She resolves that her brother is dead by reasoning that somehow, if Tadeo were alive, he would have made some attempt to cease her mourning by contacting her. As time passes, Antígona is more uncertain of the circumstances surrounding Tadeo's disappearance and becomes obsessed with the possibilities of what may have happened to him.

Antígona's search for her brother's body leads her to San Fernando, where a mass grave containing 196 bodies likely killed by narcos was discovered. There, she joins a line of other "Antigones" waiting to view a book containing pictures of the dead in search for their loved ones. The book ends with a series of poignant questions from the poem “Death” by Harold Pinter, the answers to which are testimonies by victims and family members of the disappeared. The last question posed in the text is, “Will you join me in taking up the body?”, a somber question that both Antígona González and the Greek play Antigone encompass.

== Style ==
Antígona González is a book of prose that can be read as a lyric essay or a collection of individual poems. The book is divided into three sections, each including a title that alludes to the contents of the chapter. Antígona González has a disjointed narrative, with firsthand accounts from victims of the violence in Mexico and excerpts from plays and books punctuating Antígona's story. The majority of Uribe's sources come from different Latin American variations on the Antigone story, which liken Antigone's struggle to those who have missing or dead loved ones in modern-day Latin America. The compilation of various sources are essential to the informative style of the book; reading excerpts from Antígona Furiosa by Griselda Gambaro, Antígona Vélez by Leopoldo Marechal, La tumba de Antígona by María Zambrano, and Antigone's Claim by Judith Butler within the story of Antígona González create a well-rounded perspective for the reader. The sources are incorporated in various ways to create a sense that the book is not about one specific character's journey, but represents a whole group of people. By doing so, Uribe creates a lyrical, journalistic text with a profound and political message that speaks out against the disregarded violence happening in Mexico.

Uribe uses another element of her writing —spacing— to support the language of her book. Using placement of the text to reinforce the disjointed nature of the story, Uribe positions text at the top, bottom, and middle of the page. Large sections of dead silence created by space between passages parallels the isolation Antígona and the other “Antigones” experience. Additionally, Uribe emphasizes a question, quote, or line of a poem by placing it in the middle of a blank page, guaranteeing it will catch the attention of the reader. In Antígona González, Uribe also emphasizes certain quotes by placing them before a series of related words. Each word in the series, separated by slashes, isolates an individual element of the quote that precedes it, creating a staccato-like and disjointed instrument of expression. Furthermore, repetition, especially repetition of the Antigone story, is a significant element of the book. For example, the repeated phrase “we are many,” generates a sense of defiance, indicating the strength and determination of the “Antigones” as it is echoed throughout the entirety of the text

In the English translation of Antígona González, translator Jadine Pluecker makes the choice to incorporate the original Spanish text into the book. Including the Spanish words and mirroring them to the English text ties the translation to the original. This stylistic layout makes the readers aware of the inextricable link between Antígona González and Latin America and also allows bilingual readers to compare the translated text to the original.

== Use of Antigone in Antígona González ==
Uribe utilizes a collection of Antigone stories to connect the narrative of Antígona Gonzalez to the other “Antigones” searching for loved ones in Latin America.

The classic, Greek Antigone character is most prominently represented by the titular character of the book, Antígona. Antígona's struggle to recover the body of her brother so she can bury, grieve, and come to terms with his death is the ultimate goal of the novel. However, due to the inclusive narrative of Uribe's book, everyone who loved and is searching for a missing person also assumes the role of Antigone in Antígona González.

Antígona's brother, Tadeo, along with the missing and murdered people all over the country represent Polynices in this story. In Latin America, the character of Polynices is often identified with the marginalized and disappeared due to the similarities between the Greek myth and the real-life crisis that is happening in Mexico and Central America as result of the dirty war. Uribe uses a specific example of this in her text, comparing Polynices’ body outside the gate of Thebes to the bodies of those found in San Fernando.

The Greek character of Ismene is represented in the hesitation, fear, and pushback Antígona's community voices when she reaches out to search for Tadeo. This fear, which affects many, stems from both the neglect of a useless government and the violence that threatens and surrounds everyone in Tamaulipas and beyond. Thebes, the city in which Antigone is set, is mentioned only a handful of times in Antígona Gonzalez. Uribe states that Tamaulipas is the same as Thebes because they are both cities “under siege”. Creon, the oppressive king of the Greek myth, is mentioned only once in the book as a comparison to Mexico's willful neglect of deaths and disappearances.

Authors have been using the Antigone story for decades as a way to criticize political neglect or violence. Uribe also uses this tactic in her book. In addition to quoting from Sophocles’ original Antigone, Uribe includes excerpts from Antígona Furiosa, an Argentinian pastiche from the 1980s that uses the story of Antigone to criticize the mass disappearances under the rule of a military dictator; Antígona Vélez, which is a radically altered interpretation of Antigone that calls for a new government in Argentina; Antígona, una tragedia latinoamericana, which conceptualizes the Latin American rewritings of Antigone; among others. Uribe's incorporation of a familiar story is essential to creating an easily understandable political commentary.
