= Ruby Blondell =

Professor of classics and gender studies

Ruby Blondell is professor emerita of classics and adjunct professor emerita of gender, women, & sexuality studies at the University of Washington; prior to retirement, they were the Byron W. and Alice L. Lockwood Professor of Humanities also at the University of Washington. Their research centres on Greek intellectual history, gender studies, and the reception of ancient myth in contemporary culture.

== Career ==
Blondell completed their BA and MA in classics at the University of Oxford (1978 and 1981, respectively), before receiving their PhD from the University of California, Berkeley in 1984. Their doctoral thesis was entitled Helping Friends and Harming Enemies: A Study in Sophocles and Greek Ethics.

Upon the completion of their PhD, Blondell was a lecturer at Harvard University, before moving to the University of Washington in 1985, where they have taught until retirement in 2019. Their teaching responsibilities were centred on topics of Greek literature (especially Greek tragedy), and Greek intellectual history and culture.

Blondell has held various positions within the Society for Classical Studies (formerly the American Philological Society) and the Women's Classical Caucus; and was a former treasurer for the Lambda Classical Caucus. In 2014 Blondell was awarded the inaugural Lambda Classical Caucus Activism Award; and, in 2019, they were also awarded the Women's Classical Caucus Leadership Award.

== Research Publications ==
Blondell has published widely on topics of Greek intellectual history, gender studies, and the reception of myth in contemporary culture, including the following four monographs:

- Helen of Troy in Hollywood (Martin Classical Lectures Series: Princeton University Press, 2023), developed from their 2015 Martin Lectures at Oberlin College.
- Blondell, Ruby (2013). Helen of Troy. doi:10.1093/acprof:oso/9780199731602.001.0001. ISBN 978-0-19-973160-2.
- The Play of Character in Plato's Dialogues (Cambridge University Press, 2002).
- Helping Friends and Harming Enemies: A Study in Sophocles and Greek Ethics (Cambridge University Press, 1989), published under previous name Mary Whitlock Blundell.

Blondell has edited several collections focused on gender and sexuality in the ancient world:

- Humoerotica, co-edited with Sandra Boehringer (Archimede 5, 2018).
- Ancient Sex: New Essays, co-edited with Kirk Ormand - part of the Classical Memories/Modern Identities series (Ohio University Press, 2015).
- Queer Icons from Greece and Rome (Helios 35.2, 2008).
- Ancient Mediterranean Women in Modern Mass Media, co-edited with Mary-Kay Gamel (Helios 32.2, 2005).

They have also produced several translations of the works of Sophocles and Euripides, including:

- Sophocles: The Theban Plays, Antigone, King Oidipous, Oidipous at Colonus; Updated Translations with Introductory Essay and Notes (Focus Classical Library, Newburyport MA 2002).
- Sophocles: Oidipous at Colonus, Translated with Introduction, Notes and Interpretive Essay (first published 1990; revised edition 2002; Focus Classical Library, Newburyport MA).
- Women on the Edge: Four Plays by Euripides, co-authored with Bella Zweig, Nancy Sorkin Rabinowitz and Mary-Kay Gamel (Routledge, New York and London 1999).

== Media ==
Blondell has featured in the following media broadcasts discussing their research:

- Let's Talk about Myths, Baby!, Conversations: The Face that Lit a Thousand* Screens, Helen of Troy w/ Ruby Blondell (2023).
- Forgotten Hollywood, Episode 159, discussing 'Helen of Troy in Hollywood' (2023).
- Letter of Liberty Podcast, Episode 19, discussing 'Helen of Troy' (2018).
- Interviewed for 'Wonder Women! The Untold Story of American Superheroines', directed by Kristy Guevara-Flanagan (2012).
