= Apollonides of Orapius =

Ancient Greek writer

Apollonides Orapius (Ancient Greek: Ἀπολλωνίδης) or Horapius was an ancient Greek writer who wrote a work on Egypt, entitled Semenuthi (Σεμενουθί), and seems also to have composed other works on the history and religion of the Egyptians.
