= Mary-Kay Gamel =

American classics teacher

Academic background
- Education: Smith College (BA 1963); Harvard University (MA 1964); Berkeley College (PhD, Comp. Lit)
- Thesis: Playfulness and Seriousness in Ovid’s Metamorphoses (1972)
- Doctoral advisor: William S. Anderson

Academic work
- Discipline: Classics Comparative Literature
- Sub-discipline: Greek Drama, Classical reception, Latin Literature
- Website: https://mkgamel.sites.ucsc.edu/

Mary-Kay Gamel was an American Classics scholar, and dramaturg. She specialized in Greek Drama, and was celebrated for her modern productions of Greek Drama as well as her teaching and scholarship.

== Career ==
Gamel was born in 1942, in Springfield, Massachusetts, and educated at Classical High School, where she graduated a year early summa cum laude. She studied for her BA in Classics at Smith College in 1963, and her MA in Comparative Literature at Harvard University, completing the degree in 1964. In 1963 she was winner of the Glascock Poetry Prize. During her graduate studies she won the American Academy in Rome Prize, which funded a two-year fellowship in Italy, between 1967 and 1969. She completed her PhD at Berkeley College in 1972, writing her thesis on "Playfulness and Seriousness in Ovid’s Metamorphoses." During her graduate studies, she spent one summer working as a go-go dancer in a bar in San Francisco. From Berkeley, she moved to Boston University, teaching there for four years as Instructor and then Assistant Professor in Classics.

In 1973 Gamel moved to UC Santa Cruz, becoming one of the first members of its Classics Faculty. Only two years later, she was recognised in an article by People Magazine, who "saluted [her] for excellence" along with 11 other college educators as "great teachers, [because of whom] some students’ lives will be forever changed," and credited her with helping to increase enrolment in the new Classics programme by 20%. The Magazine described her relaxed style and lively lectures, and quoted her describing her approach to her specialty: "I feel I am custodian of a great treasure." Over the course of her career at UC Santa Cruz, she served as Chair of the Literature (2005-8), Theatre Arts (1991-4), and Language (1990-2000) programmes.

Although she began her career teaching predominantly ancient literature (especially Latin), a major shift in her approach in 1985 occurred when she contributed the translation for a student performance of Medea, and from then focused on the translation and modern production of ancient drama in her research and teaching. Gamel was responsible for directing a wide range of modern productions of Ancient Greek Drama, and credited with involvement in some form in fifty-four theatrical productions. Her productions demonstrated a modern, often avowedly political approach to the ancient materials, and their distinctive approach meant that she was invited to restage productions internationally.

She retired in 2015, and died in 2024.

== Influence ==
The Society for Classical Studies renamed its 'Scholarly Outreach Prize' to the Mary-Kay Gamel Outreach Prize in Gamel's honour, with notable recipients including Gamel herself, Candida Moss, Michele Ronnick Peter Meineck, Sarah Bond and Marianne McDonald. The prize "recognizes outstanding projects or events by an SCS member or members that make an aspect of classical antiquity available and attractive to an audience other than classics scholars or students in their courses."

== Selected works ==
- GAMEL, M.-K. (2001). “APOLLO KNOWS I HAVE NO CHILDREN”: MOTHERHOOD, SCHOLARSHIP, THEATER. Arethusa, 34(2), 153–171. http://www.jstor.org/stable/44578428
- Blondell, R., Gamel, M. K., Rabinowitz, N. S., & Vivante, B. (2002). Women on the edge: Four plays by Euripides. Routledge.
- Gamel, M. K. (ed.) (2002) Performing/ Transforming Aristophanes’ Thesmophoriazousai American Journal of Philology, Volume 123, Number 3
- Blondell, R., & Gamel, M. K. (2005). Ancient Mediterranean Women in Modern Mass Media. Texas Tech University Press.
- Gamel, M. K. (2007) “Sondheim Floats Frogs.” in Aristophanes in Performance 421 BC-AD 2007: Peace, Birds, and Frogs, ed. Edith Hall and Amanda Wrigley (Oxford: Oxford U. Press, 2007)
- Gamel, M. K. (2010) “Revising ‘Authenticity’ in Staging Ancient Mediterranean Drama,” in Theorising Performance Reception: Greek Drama, Cultural History and Critical Practice, ed. Edith Hall and Stephen Harrop (London: Duckworth)
- Gamel, M. K. (2017). Translation and/in performance: my experiments. In Adapting Translation for the Stage, ed. Emma Cole and Geraldine Brodie. Routledge.

== Selected Translations/Versions ==
- The Frogs, a version of Aristophanes’ Frogs, with Audrey Stanley (1989)
- Effie and the Barbarians, a version of Euripides’ Iphigenia among the Taurians (1995)
- The Julie Thesmo Show, a version of Aristophanes’ Women at the Thesmophoria (2000)
- The Conversion of Thais, a translation of Hrotsvit of Gandersheim’s play (2003)
- Helen of Egypt, a version of Euripides’ Helen (2008)
- Orestes Terrorist, a version of Euripides’ Orestes (2011)
- The Congressladies, a version of Aristophanes’ Ecclesiazousai (2015)
