= Apollonides of Syracuse =

Apollonides (Ancient Greek: Ἀπολλωνίδης) of Syracuse, Magna Graecia, was a prominent citizen who, during the dissensions among his fellow-citizens, in the time of the Second Punic War, as to whether they were to join the Carthaginians or the Romans, insisted upon the necessity of acting with decision either the one or the other way, as division on this point would lead to inevitable ruin. At the same time, he suggested that it would be advantageous to remain faithful to the Romans.
