= Apollonides of Sparta =

Ancient Greek official

Apollonides (Ancient Greek: Ἀπολλωνίδης) of Sparta was appointed in 181 BCE as one of the treasurers to check the system of squandering the public money which had been carried on for some time by Chaeron, a low demagogue. As Apollonides was the person whom Chaeron had most to fear, he had him assassinated by his emissaries.
