= Hegelochus (actor) =

Athenian actor

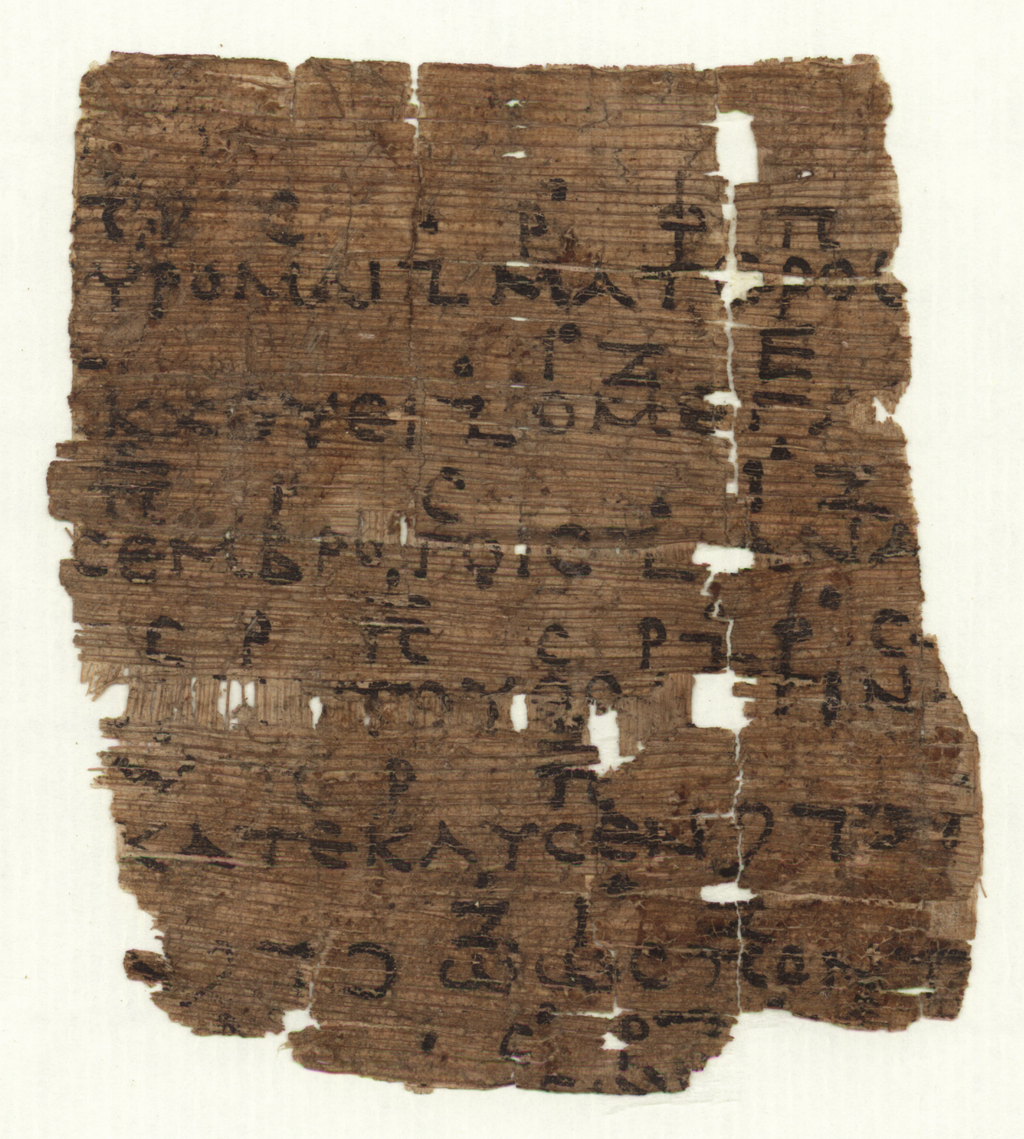
Fragment of Euripides' Orestes c. 200 BC, located in Hermopolis, Egypt

Hegelochus (Ancient Greek: Ἡγέλοχος, fl. 408 BC) was an ancient Greek tragic actor active in Athens in the 5th century BC. He is remembered for an infamous pronunciation error during the premiere of Euripides' tragedy Orestes in 408 BC. The incident gave birth to a popular comedic catchphrase, which was referenced in later Greek and Latin poetry.

== Orestes ==
Hegelochus was selected as the lead actor for the premiere of Euripides' Orestes at the City Dionysia dramatic festival in 408 BC. He is the only actor known by name to have originated the title role in a surviving Greek tragedy. The performance took place in the Theatre of Dionysus on the south slope of the Athenian Acropolis, a venue that could accommodate up to 15,000 spectators.

== Pronunciation error ==
In line 279 of the play, the character Orestes, recovering from a fit of madness, is intended to deliver an optimistic line: "after the storm I see again a calm sea" (Ancient Greek: ἐκ κυμάτων γὰρ αὖθις αὖ γαλήν' ὁρῶ, romanized: ek kymatōn gar authis au galēn' horô). However, Hegelochus faltered in his delivery, dropping his pitch too early on the final syllable. This transformed the word γαλήν' (galḗn', an elided form of γαληνά, meaning "calm sea") into γαλῆν (galên, meaning "weasel"). Thus, the audience heard the absurd line: "After the storm I see again a weasel."

This error was rooted in the tonal pitch system of Ancient Greek, where a change in pitch accent could drastically alter a word's meaning, similar to tonal languages like modern Mandarin Chinese or Punjabi. The intended γαλήν' required an acute accent (a rise in pitch), while the mistaken γαλῆν carried a circumflex (a rise and subsequent fall). The cause of the slip was attributed by ancient commentators to the actor "running out of breath" and failing to properly execute the necessary elision.

== Mockery in Old Comedy ==
Hegelochus's blunder quickly became a favorite target for the poets of Old Comedy, who used it to satirize the pretensions of tragic actors. The incident was referenced in multiple plays, cementing Hegelochus's legacy as a laughable figure.

- Aristophanes referenced the mistake in his comedy The Frogs (405 BC). In lines 302–304, the character Xanthias, after a frightening encounter, quips: "Take heart: everything's turned out well for us, and now like Hegelochos we can say, 'For after the storm I see once more a weasel!'"
- Sannyrion wrote a parody in his play Danae, in which the god Zeus contemplates transforming into a weasel to sneak into a lover's chamber, only to fear being exposed by Hegelochus, who would inevitably shout his famous line upon seeing him.
- Strattis was the most prolific in his mockery. In his play The Human Orestes (Ἀνθρωπορραιστής), he blamed the play's failure on the hiring of Hegelochus, claiming the actor "murdered Euripides' quite clever drama." In another play, Psychastae, he wrote a dialogue that reenacted the verbal confusion for comedic effect: "(A) I see a weasel! (B) Where? (A) Calm sea! (B) Oh, I thought you said you saw a weasel."
- The comic poet Plato also made reference to the gaffe in his works.

He reportedly never acted again after the incident.

== Scholarly analysis ==
Modern scholarship has examined the incident as a prime example of the intense pressure and high stakes of live performance in ancient Athens. The event highlights the fragility of the tragic illusion, which could be shattered by a single, small mispronunciation, turning pathos into bathos. It also provides valuable insight into the rivalrous relationship between the genres of tragedy and comedy, with the latter seizing any opportunity to mock the former's pretensions. While some scholars have suggested that the error may have been due to the audience's mishearing rather than the actor's fault, the incident remains the most well-documented case of an actor's mistake from the ancient world.
