= Beth Piatote =

Native American scholar and author

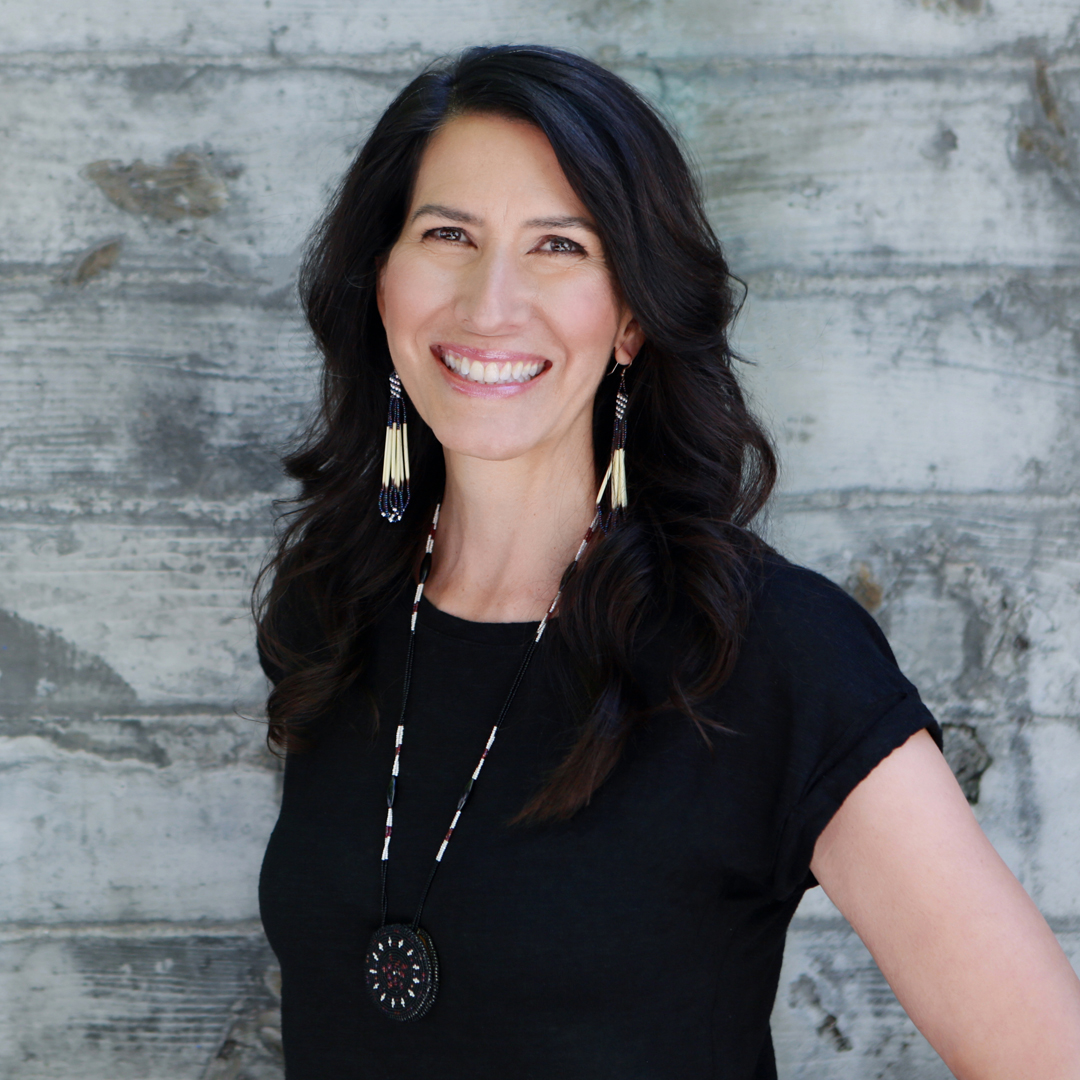
Piatote in 2021

Beth Piatote is a Nimi:pu: (Nez Perce) scholar and author. She is a member of Chief Joseph's Tribe and the Colville Confederated Tribes. Piatote is an associate professor, holding a dual appointment in Comparative Literature and Native American Studies at University of California, Berkeley. Piatote holds a PhD in Modern Thought and Literature from Stanford University.

== Life ==
In the mid-1990s, Piatote worked as a reporter with the Eugene Register-Guard. Her research interests include Indigenous language revitalization with a focus on Ni:mi:pu: (Nez Perce) language and literature, Native American/Aboriginal literature and federal Indian law in the United States and Canada, as well as American literature and cultural studies, history and law. Piatote now resides in the San Francisco Bay Area with her two children.

== Works ==
=== Academic writing ===
- Domestic Subject: Gender, Citizenship and Law in Native American Literature (Yale University Press, 2013)

=== Short story collections ===
- The Beadworkers (CounterPoint Press, 2019)

==== Articles ====
- The News of the Day (2009, University of Nebraska Press)
- Our (Someone Else's) Father: Articulation, Dysarticulation, and Indigenous Literary Traditions (2010, Kenyon University)
- Domestic Trials: Indian Rights and National Belonging in Works by E. Pauline Johnson and John M. Oskiso (2011, The Johns Hopkins University Press)
- The Indian/Agent Aporia (2013, University of Nebraska Press)
- Indian Country: Between Native Claims and Modernist Desires (2017, University of Cambridge Press)
- “Stories Were Everywhere” (2018, University of North Carolina University Press)

== Awards ==
- MLA Prize for Studies in Native American Literatures, Cultures, and Languages, 2012-13 (honorable mention for Domestic Subject: Gender, Citizenship and Law in Native American Literature)
- University of California Regents Junior Faculty Fellowship, 2012
- Ford Foundation Postdoctoral Fellowship, 2009–2010
- Hellman Family Faculty Fund Award, 2009
- Whiting Dissertation Fellowship in the Humanities, 2006–07
- Graduate Research Opportunity Grant, Stanford University, 2003
- Ford Foundation Predoctoral Fellowship, 2001–03
