= Stasimon =

Stationary song in Ancient Greek tragedy

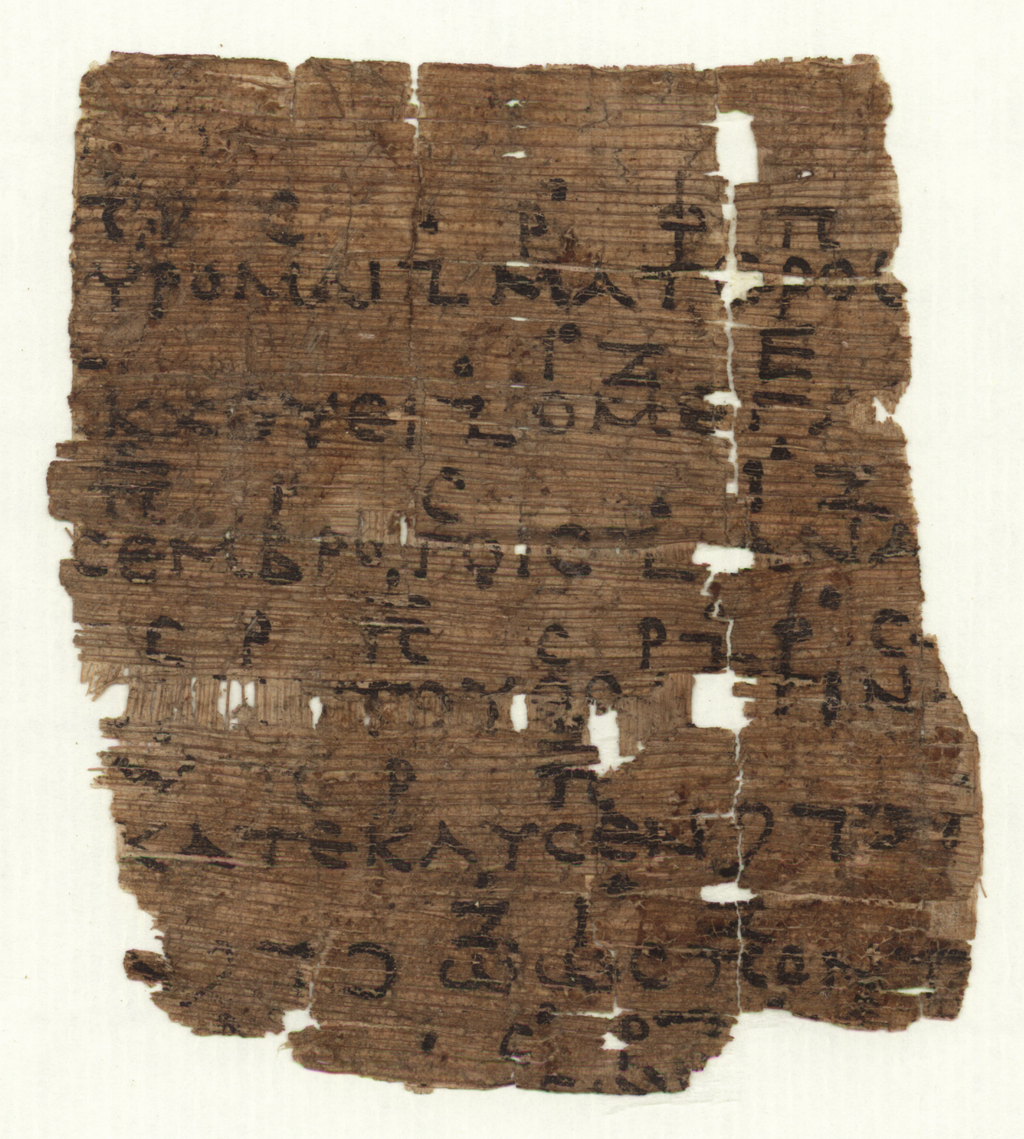
The Orestes Papyrus, a fragment of lines 338-344 from the first stasimon of Orestes by Euripides, dated to the third century BCE

A Stasimon (Ancient Greek: στάσιμον) in Greek tragedy is a stationary song composed of strophes and antistrophes that is performed by the chorus in the orchestra (Ancient Greek: ὀρχήστρα, "place where the chorus dances").

Aristotle states in the Poetics (1452b23) that each choral song (or melos) of a tragedy is divided into two parts: the parodos (Ancient Greek: πάροδος) and the stasimon. He defines the latter as "a choral song without anapaests or trochaics". This comment about the absence of anapest and trochee has been interpreted to mean that the music was not based on the usual “walking” meters, since the chorus sings the stasimon while remaining in the orchestra. After making its entrance singing the parodos, it does not usually leave the orchestra until the end of the play.

The Suda, an 11th-century Byzantine encyclopedia, attributes the establishment of the choral singing of a stasimon to the celebrated kitharode Arion of Hermione.
