= Apollonides of Cardia =

Apollonides (Ancient Greek: Ἀπολλωνίδης) of Cardia was a man of ancient Greece to whom Philip II of Macedon assigned for his private use the whole territory of the Thracian Chersonesus. Apollonides was afterwards sent by Charidemus as ambassador to Philip.
