= Sara Uribe Sánchez =

Mexican poet (born 1978)

Sara Uribe
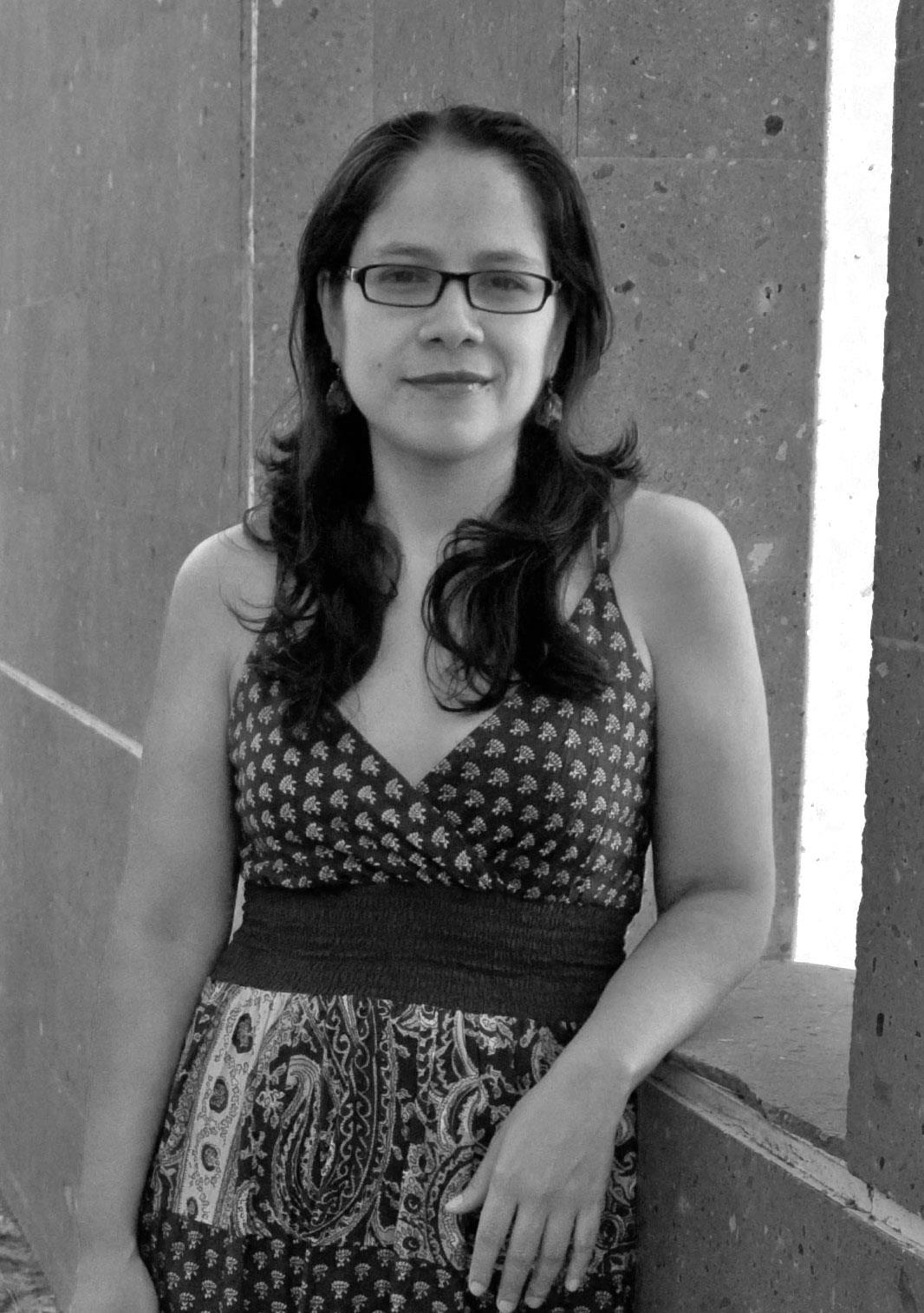
- Born: 1978 (age 47–48); Mexico
- Writing career
- Language: Spanish
- Genre: poetry

Sara María Uribe Sánchez (born 1978 Querétaro) is a Mexican poet. Her poems have appeared in periodicals and anthologies in Mexico, Peru, Spain, Canada, the United Kingdom and the United States.

== Life ==
Born in 1978 in Querétaro, Mexico, Uribe has lived in Tamaulipas since 1996. She graduated with an undergraduate degree in philosophy.

== Awards ==
- 2004 Carmen Alardín Regional Poetry Prize in 2004
- 2005 Tijuana National Poetry Prize
- 2005 Clemente López Trujillo Poetry Prize
- 2006-2007 Fondo Nacional para la Cultura y las Artes
- 2010 & 2013 Programa de Estímulos a la Creación y Desarrollo Artístico

== Works ==
- Lo que no imaginas Fondo Regional para la Cultura y las Artes del Noreste, 2005. ISBN 9789685724357, OCLC 307746566
- Palabras más palabras menos Tijuana, Baja California : Instituto Municipal de Arte y Cultura, 2006. OCLC 174050703
- Nunca quise detener el tiempo Ciudad Victoria, Tamaulipas [Mexico] : Gobierno del Estado de Tamaulipas, Instituto Tamaulipeco para la Cultura y las Artes, 2007. OCLC 420196888
- Goliat (2009)
- Siam Consejo Nacional para la Cultura y las Artes, Dirección General de Publicaciones, 2012. ISBN 9786075160108, OCLC 853456825
- Antigona Gonzalez Oaxaca de Juárez, Oaxaca : SurPlus Ediciones, 2012. ISBN 9786078147182, OCLC 911662075

Works in English

- Antigona Gonzalez, John Pluecker translator, Les Figues Press, 2016, ISBN 9781934254646, OCLC 947149035
