= Karl August Klüpfel =

German historian and librarian

Karl August Klüpfel (8 April 1810, in Darmsheim – 11 April 1894, in Tübingen) was a German historian and librarian. He was a son-in-law of writer Gustav Schwab.

Beginning in 1828, he studied philosophy and theology at the University of Tübingen. In 1841 he began work as second librarian at the Universitätsbibliothek Tübingen, where from 1863 to 1881, he served as first librarian.

== Published works ==
He was editor of Urkunden zur Geschichte des Schwäbischen Bundes (1488–1533) ("Documented history of the Swabian League (1488-1533)"), published in two parts (Teil 1, involving the years 1488–1506, issued in 1846; Teil 2, involving the years 1507–1533, issued in 1853). He was also author of the following works:

- Geschichte und Beschreibung der Universität Tübingen, Fues, Tübingen 1849 – History and description of the University of Tübingen.
- Die deutschen Einheitsbestrebungen in ihrem geschichtlichen Zusammenhang dargestellt, Mayer, Leipzig 1853 – German unification efforts in their historical context.
- Gustav Schwab : sein Leben und Wirken, Brockhaus, Leipzig 1858 – Gustav Schwab: his life and work.
- Kaiser Maximilian I. Brigl & Lobeck, Berlin 1864 – Emperor Maximilian I.
- Geschichte der deutschen Einheitsbestrebungen bis zu ihrer Erfüllung : 1848-1871, Springer, Berlin (two volumes, 1872–73) – History of German unification efforts prior to fulfillment: 1848–1871.
- Die Universität Tübingen in ihrer Vergangenheit und Gegenwart dargestellt, Leipzig 1877 – The University of Tübingen, past and present.
