= Apollonides (physician) =

Apollonides (Ancient Greek: Ἀπολλωνίδης) was the name of a number of physicians of ancient Greece:

- Apollonides of Cos
- Another Greek physician, who must have lived in the first or second century, as he is said by Galen to have differed from Archigenes respecting the state of the pulse during sleep. No other particulars are known of his history; but he is sometimes confounded with Apollonius of Cyprus, a mistake which has arisen from reading Apollonidon (Ἀπολλωνίδον) instead of "Apolloniou" (Ἀπολλωνίου) in the passage of Galen where the latter physician is mentioned. He may perhaps be the same person who is mentioned by Artemidorus, and Aëtius of Amida, in which last passage the name is spelled "Apolloniades".
