= Apollonides of Olynthus =

Apollonides (Ancient Greek: Ἀπολλωνίδης) of Olynthus was a general who used his influence at Olynthus against Philip II of Macedon. The king, with the assistance of his intriguing agents in that town, contrived to induce the people to send Apollonides into exile. Apollonides went to Athens, where he was honored with the civic franchise; but being found unworthy, he was afterwards deprived of it.
