= Apollonides of Sicyon =

Ambassador of ancient Greece in the 2nd century BCE

Apollonides (Ancient Greek: Ἀπολλωνίδης) of Sicyon was a man of ancient Greece who served as an ambassador for Achaea in the 2nd century BCE.

When in 186 the great congress was held at Megalopolis, and the Attalid king Eumenes II wished to form an alliance with the Achaeans, and offered them a large sum of money as a present with a view of securing their favor, Apollonides of Sicyon strongly opposed the Achaeans' accepting the money, as something unworthy of them, and which would expose them to the influence of the king. He was supported by some other distinguished Achaeans, and they magnanimously refused accepting the money.

At this congress Roman ambassadors also had been present, and after their return, Spartan and Achaean ambassadors went to Rome in 185. Among the latter was Apollonides, who endeavored to explain to the Roman senate the real state of affairs at Sparta, against the Spartan ambassadors, and to vindicate the conduct of Philopoemen and the Achaeans against the charges of the Spartans. At the outbreak of the war between the Romans and Perseus of Macedon, Apollonides advised his countrymen not to oppose the Romans openly, but at the same time he censured severely those who were for throwing themselves into their hands altogether.
