= Apollonides of Boeotia =

Soldier of Ancient Greece

Apollonides (Ancient Greek: Ἀπολλωνίδης) of Boeotia was a soldier of ancient Greece who was an officer in the Greek army which supported the claims of Cyrus the Younger. He was a man of no courage, and the difficulties which the Greeks had to encounter led him to oppose Xenophon, and to urge the necessity of entering into friendly relations with king Artaxerxes II of Persia. He was rebuked by Xenophon, and deprived of his office for having said things unworthy of a Greek.
