= George Adams (translator) =

18th-century English scholar and translator

George Adams (1698? – 1768?), was an English translator, in prose, of Sophocles. He was probably a clergyman, polemic and apologist.

== Biography ==
Adams was sometime a fellow of St. John's College, Cambridge, where he took his degrees of B.A. and M.A. respectively in 1719 and 1735. Between these two dates he published the work by which he is best known, entitled The Tragedies of Sophocles, translated from the Greek. With Notes Historical, Moral, and Critical, London, 1729. At this time he was either beneficed or otherwise established in the immediate neighbourhood of Kimbolton Castle, for, in the dedication of his Sophocles to William Montagu, 2nd Duke of Manchester, with whom he was on terms of intimacy or acquaintanceship, he speaks of the joy diffused by his grace's presence amongst those ‘who lived near the place of his usual residence,’ and of the ‘sadness and discontent’ which sat ‘upon every brow’ at his absence when, in fulfilment of his duties as a lord of the bedchamber, he was called away to ‘shine as a star in its proper sphere near the person of his majesty.’ The context of these passages shows the author to have been an ardent Protestant and a devoted partisan of the Hanoverian succession.

In addition to his translation of Sophocles, Adams wrote what David Elisha Davy called The Heathen Martyr, and what the Gentleman's Magazine for October 1746 registered amongst the books and pamphlets published during that month as The Life of Socrates: an Historical Tragedy, London, 1746. It is not unlikely that Adams was the author of An Exposition of some Articles of Religion, which strike at the Tenets of the Arians and Socinians. Likewise at the Infidels, Romanists, Lutherans, and Calvinists. In several Sermons and Dissertations, London, 1752. In a Latin dedication to Dr. Thomas Sherlock, bishop of London, the author of this work describes himself as having exercised his sacred office (sacro munere) in that diocese for a period of over twenty years.

It is equally possible further to credit him with another volume, the identity of whose authorship with that of the Exposition is generally accepted, by George Adams, M.A. entitled A System of Divinity, Ecclesiastical History, and Morality. Collected from the Writings of Authors of various Nations and Languages, and from the noblest Doctors of the Christian Church, London, 1768.

Adams may have been the same with the Rev. George Adams who was preferred to the prebend of Seaford on 24 August 1736, and was transferred to that of Wittering on 28 October following, both in the cathedral church of Chichester, and who vacated the latter in 1751–2. Of course the System of Divinity may have been of posthumous publication; but if the foregoing surmises be correct, Adams probably died not before 1768, the year of the issue of his latest work, when he was about seventy years of age.
