= Apollonides of Chios =

Apollonides (Ancient Greek: Ἀπολλωνίδης) of Chios was during the eastern expedition of Alexander the Great one of the leaders of the Persian party in his native island; but while Alexander was in Egypt, Apollonides was conquered by the king's admirals, Hegelochus and Amphoterus. He and several of his partisans were taken prisoners and sent to Elephantine in Egypt, where they were kept in close imprisonment.
