= Apollonides of Nicaea =

Apollonides of Nicaea (Ancient Greek: Ἀπολλωνίδης ὁ Νικαεύς) lived in the time of the Roman emperor Tiberius, to whom he dedicated a commentary on the Silloi of Timon of Phlius.

Apollonides wrote several works, all of which are lost:

- A commentary on the orations of Demosthenes (περὶ παραπρεσβείας).
- On fictitious stories (περὶ κατεψευσμένων), of which the third and eighth books are mentioned.
- A work on proverbs.
- A work on Ion, the tragic poet.

An Apollonides, without any statement as to what was his native country, is mentioned by Strabo, Pliny the Elder, and by the Scholiast on Apollonius of Rhodes, as the author of a work called Circumnavigation of Europe (περίπλος τῆς Εὐρώπης). Stobaeus quotes some senarii from one Apollonides.
