= Niobe (disambiguation) =

Niobe may refer to:

== Greek mythology ==
- Niobe, daughter of Tantalus and Dione
- Niobe (daughter of Phoroneus)

== Arts and entertainment ==
- Niobe, a lost play by Aeschylus
- Niobe, a lost play by Sophocles
- Niobe, regina di Tebe, a 1688 opera by Agostino Steffani (1653–1728)
- Niobe, an 1826 opera seria by composer Giovanni Pacini (1796-1867)
- The Destruction of the Children of Niobe (c. 1759–1760), a painting by Richard Wilson
- Niobe room, a room in the Uffizi Gallery, Florence, Italy
- Tearless Niobe, one of the "Olga Poems" by Denise Levertov
- Niobe (film), American silent film by Edwin S. Porter
- Niobe (Paulton play), an 1892 farce by Harry Paulton
- Niobe, German electronic musician who has provided vocals for artists such as Mouse On Mars
- Deep Niobe, a fictional character in the manga series Saint Seiya
- "Niobe", a song by Caribou from Andorra (album)
- Niobe Kaftan, a character in Piers Anthony's Incarnations of Immortality series
- Niobe (The Matrix), a character in the film The Matrix Reloaded
- Niobe Vorena, a character in the television series Rome

== Science and technology ==
- 71 Niobe, an asteroid
- Moss-forest rat (Rattus niobe), a species of rodent in the family Muridae
- Niobe fritillary (Argynnis niobe), a butterfly of the family Nymphalidae
- Niobe ground squirrel (Lariscus niobe), a species of rodent in the family Sciuridae
- Niobe's shrew (Crocidura niobe), a species of mammal in the family Soricidae
- Orachrysops niobe, a species of butterfly in the family Lycaenidae
- Niobe (trilobite), a genus of trilobites

== Ships ==
- HMS Niobe, four ships of the Royal Navy
  - HMCS Niobe, a Diadem-class protected cruiser transferred to the Royal Canadian Navy
- German anti-aircraft cruiser Niobe, a German World War II vessel
- SMS Niobe a German Gazelle-class light cruiser of World War I
- Niobe (schooner) (1922–1932), a tall ship used by the German Navy to train cadets and aspiring NCOs
- MV Niobe I, a passenger ferry in service 1995-2000

== See also ==
- Niobium, an element
