= Niobe (ship) =

Several ships have borne the name Niobe, after the figure of Niobe in Greek mythology

- German anti-aircraft cruiser Niobe, ex-HNLMS Gelderland, Dutch ship taken over by the Germans during World War II
- Niobe (schooner), a tall ship used by the German Navy to train cadets which sank during a squall in 1932
- HMS Niobe, four ships of the Royal Navy have borne the name HMS Niobe, after the figure of Niobe in Greek mythology
- French frigate Diane (1796), was recommissioned in the Royal Navy as HMS Niobe
