= Jombert =

Jombert is a surname. Notable people with the surname include:

- Charles-Antoine Jombert, French bookseller and publisher
- Pierre-Charles Jombert, French painter
