= Niobe (Aeschylus play) =

Lost tragedy by Aeschylus

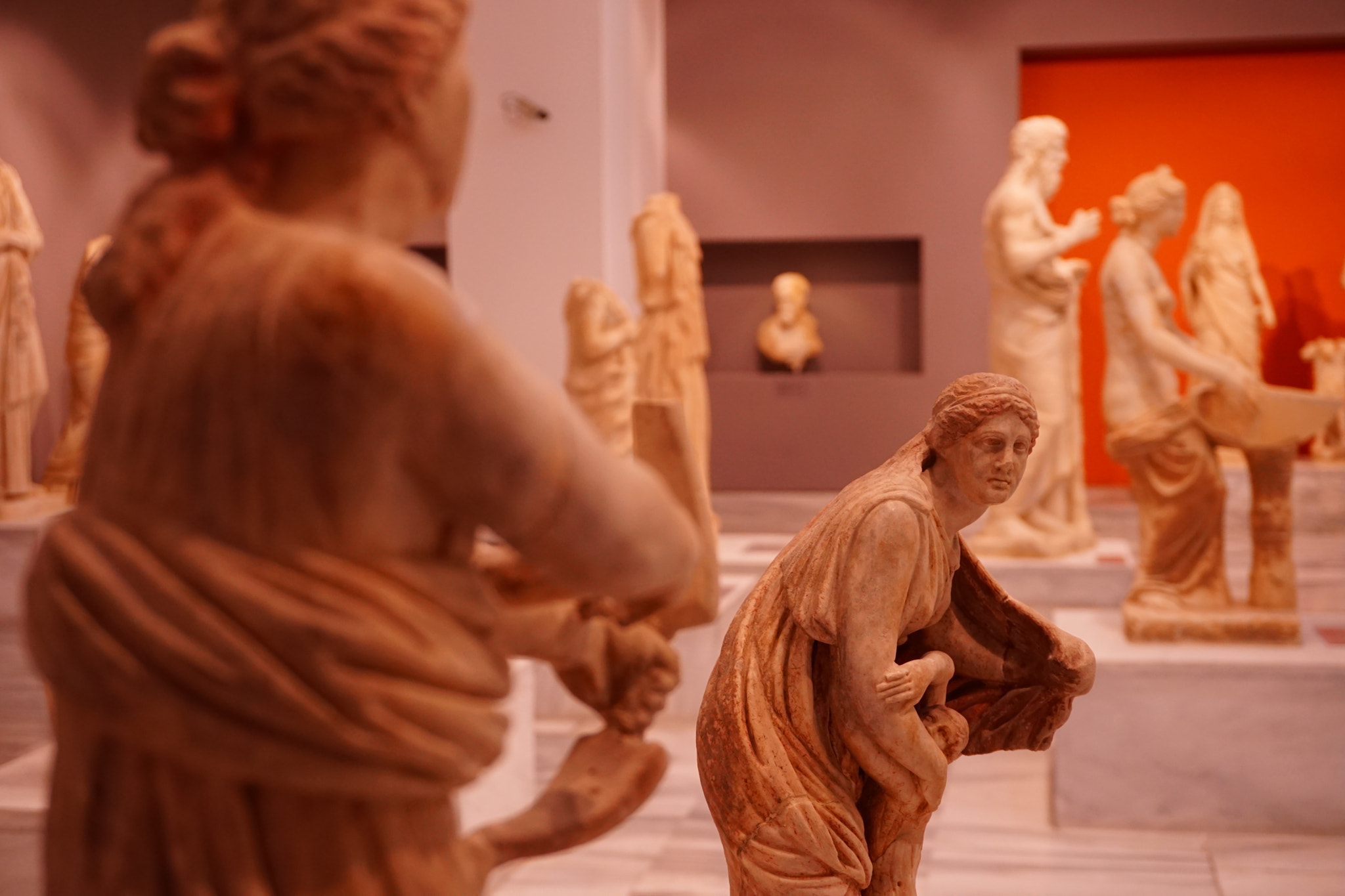
- Complex of statuettes of Artemis shooting Niobe's youngest daughter, Roman period, Heraklion Archaeological Museum.
- Original language: Ancient Greek
- Written by: Aeschylus
- Based on: The myth of Niobe
- Chorus: Lydian girls (?)
- Characters: Niobe; Tantalus; Nurse (?)
- Genre: Tragedy
- Setting: Thebes, Greece

Premiere
- Date: 5^{th} century BC
- Place: Athens

Niobe (Ancient Greek: Νιόβη, romanized: Niobe) is a lost play by Aeschylus, an Athenian dramatist of the early fifth century BC. The play dealt with the aftermath of Artemis and Apollo's revenge against Niobe, queen of Thebes, who boasted of being superior to Leto. The play, which begins after the action, mostly centered on Niobe's father Tantalus finding out about the tragic events while Niobe sat wordless and immobile next to her children's graves. Very few fragments remain, making the reconstruction of the play's plot difficult.

== Background ==
=== The myth ===
The myth of Niobe, the hubristic queen who challenged the goddess Leto is first recounted in the Iliad, according to which Niobe boasted of being equal to the goddess for having borne twelve children, six sons and six daughters, while Leto only had two. Those two however were Artemis and Apollo, and they avenged their mother by shooting all of the Niobids dead with their arrows, and leaving them lying in their own blood for nine days. Niobe was eventually petrified near Mount Sipylus (in western Asia Minor) out of grief. No other family or lineage for Niobe is mentioned in Homer, and Aeschylus is the oldest known author to have made Amphion her husband and Tantalus her father; however none of the poets and writers who followed disputed those elements.

=== The play ===
The play premiered during the City Dionysia around the first half of the fifth century BC, some time before 455 BC (Aeschylus' death). It is not clear which other plays completed the tetralogy, or what place Aeschylus got in the contest. Sophocles' own version of the story was produced after Aeschylus'. Aeschylus increased the number of children from twelve to fourteen, equally divided between seven sons and seven daughters.

About ten fragments have been attributed to Aeschylus' Niobe, the longest of which was published in 1933. Other than that, important information about the play comes from Aristophanes's comedy The Frogs, in which the deceased Euripides mocks Aeschylus by criticising his Niobe, particularly the titular protagonist's veiled silence throughout most of the play and then her use of overcomplicated eloquence the moment she speaks. This establishes that Niobe is present throughout the play, but covers her face, and does not have lines or interact with the rest of the characters until the later acts. The chorus was female, though its exact identity is indecipherable; Hermann suggested they were Lydian girls accompanying Tantalus in his trip to Thebes. Due to Amphion's absence from surviving fragments and references to the play, he most likely perished before the play's opening as well.

== Plot ==
The play begins on the third day after Artemis and Apollo have already killed the Niobids, as Niobe mourns them silently by their tombs. It is not clear whether Aeschylus described in detail the manner in which the Niobids were killed or not.

An extensive fragment shows a speaker describing Niobe's current situation, the events that led to it, and Tantalus' imminent arrival at Thebes. The character also talks against mortals committing hubris (insolent arrogance) against the gods. The identity of this speaker has caused much debate; a mother, either Niobe's (called Euryanassa or Dione) or Amphion's (Antiope) has been proposed, but this idea clashes with the speaker's aloof and somewhat judgemental tone. It is likely that this is Niobe's old wetnurse, a woman who has known Niobe since she was young; in addition, nurses in ancient dramas tend to be a lot more daring and outspoken compared to the other slaves.

Tantalus arrives next; a fragment that implies he does not recognise Niobe at first and calls her a stranger has been assigned to this tragedy by Radt, but also rejected and removed by others. Tantalus appears to be unaware of the tragedy that has struck his daughter's family, as he enters and boasts of his vast kingdom, his visit to Thebes pre-planned. Someone then had to inform Tantalus; as at this point in the history of theatre only two actors could be on stage at any time, and both actors were already occupied (as Niobe and Tantalus), leaving the chorus leader as the sole possibility as to who tells Tantalus, who then bemoans humanity and human-originating things.

The play offered little action or plot development, and most of it seems to have revolved around Tantalus learning the bad news and trying in vain to comfort his daughter. Niobe joined the lament, bitter about the fact that Zeus did little to honour his own blood, perhaps referring to her father and her husband both (as sons of Zeus). Finally, someone says how of all gods Death alone cannot be persuaded, and no gift or sacrifice will move him. This could be Tantalus or the nurse talking to Niobe, or Niobe herself coming to terms with her situation.

The ending of Niobe is not preserved; a fragmentary papyrus from Oxyrhynchus (P. Oxy. 213) contains a passage that some scholars have connected to Aeschylus' drama. In it, it is evident that someone is being likened to stone, either literally or figuratively, while an emotionally charged speaker displays anguished exhortation to be told what is going on. Although traditionally her transformation took place in Niobe's homeland Lydia, the play might have omitted that, and have Niobe transform after praying to Zeus.

== See also ==
- Amaleus, one of the Niobids
- Assaon, Niobe's father in a Lydian tradition
- Aëdon, Niobe's Theban rival

== Bibliography ==
- Aristophanes, The Frogs, translated by Matthew Dilon, Ed. Available online at Perseus Digital Library.
- Podlecki, Anthony (2023). "Slices from Aeschylus's Feasts: The Fragmentary Works". In Bromberg, Jacques A.; Burian, Peter (eds.). A Companion to Aeschylus. Wiley-Blackwell. ISBN 9781405188043.
- Gantz, Timothy (1996). Early Greek Myth: A Guide to Literary and Artistic Sources. Vol. II. Johns Hopkins University Press. ISBN 978-0-8018-5362-3.
- Hermann, G. (1828). Opuscula. Vol. III. Leipzig.
- Hathorn, Richmond Y. (1967). Crowell's Handbook to Classical Drama. NYC, United States: Thomas Y. Crowell Company. ISBN 0-690-22501-6.
- Homer, The Iliad with an English Translation by A. T. Murray, PhD in two volumes. Cambridge, MA., Harvard University Press; London, William Heinemann, Ltd. 1924. Online version at the Perseus Digital Library.
- Kalamara, Zoe (2017). Ο μύθος της Νιόβης στις ομώνυμες τραγωδίες του Αισχύλου και του Σοφοκλή [The Myth of Niobe in the Homonymous Tragedies of Aeschylus and Sophocles] (PDF) (Thesis) (in Greek). Thessaloniki, Greece: Aristotle University of Thessaloniki.
- Radt, S. L. (1985). Tragicorum Graecorum Fragmenta (TrGF). Vol. 3: Aeschylus. Göttingen.
- Sommerstein, Alan H., ed. (2009). Aeschylus: Fragments. Loeb Classical Library 505. Cambridge, MA: Harvard University Press.
