= Alastair Miles =

British operatic and concert bass (born 1961)

- Born: 11 July 1961 (age 64); Harrow, England
- Education: Guildhall School of Music; Royal Academy of Music
- Occupation(s): opera singer, bass
- Awards: Decca-Kathleen Ferrier Award (1986); John Christie Award (1987)

Alastair Miles (born 11 July 1961, Harrow, England) is a British operatic and concert bass who has had an international career since the late 1980s.

== Biography ==
=== Education ===
Alastair Miles was educated at The John Lyon School, Harrow, and subsequently at St Marylebone Grammar School. He began flute lessons at the age of fourteen with the composer Albert Alan Owen, a pupil of Nadia Boulanger, who inspired him to think about a career in music. Miles studied flute at the Guildhall School of Music under Trevor Wye, Peter Lloyd and Edward Beckett. He became an orchestral player and taught at Stowe School and Chetham's School of Music before embarking on his vocal career. From 1982 to 1985 he sang as a Lay Clerk in the choir of St. Albans Cathedral under the direction of Stephen Darlington. Having studied with bass-baritone Richard Standen whilst at the Guildhall, he was prompted by English National Opera baritone Geoffrey Chard, a near-neighbour of his parents, to have lessons with Bruce Boyce. It was while he was with Boyce that he decided on a career in opera, and in 1986 won a place at the National Opera Studio.

=== Awards ===
Alastair Miles won the 1986 Decca-Kathleen Ferrier Award at Wigmore Hall and the 1987 John Christie Award at the Glyndebourne Festival. His recording of Mendelssohn's Elijah, in which he sang the title role, won Gramophone magazine's Best Choral Award for 1993.

== Career ==
Alastair Miles is well known for bel canto roles and is considered an ideal Verdi bass. He has been called 'the finest bass of his generation'.

=== Operatic roles ===
Alastair Miles has sung at the Metropolitan Opera (Sparafucile in Rigoletto, Giorgio in I Puritani and Raimondo in Lucia di Lammermoor); Paris – Bastille (Raimondo); Vienna (Prefetto in Linda di Chamonix, Giorgio in I Puritani, Cardinal Brogni in La Juive, Silva in Ernani, Zaccaria in Nabucco, Walter in Luisa Miller, Philippe II in Don Carlos, Padre Guardiano in La Forza del Destino and Nick Shadow in The Rake's Progress); Bayerische Staatsoper (Giorgio, Raimondo, title role in Handel's Saul, Zoroastro in Orlando); San Francisco Opera (Giorgio, Raimondo and Basilio in Il Barbiere di Siviglia); Amsterdam (Figaro in Le Nozze di Figaro, Raimondo), Madrid (Philip II in Don Carlo, Raimondo and Muley-Hassem in Emilio Arrieta's La Conquista di Granata); Seville (Mephistopheles in Gounod's Faust); Palermo (Walter in Luisa Miller); Pesaro (Le Gouverneur in Rossini's Le Compte Ory) and La Scala, Milan (Melisso in Alcina and Lord Sidney in Il Viaggio a Rheims).

He regularly appears with all the UK opera companies. Roles for Welsh National Opera include Colline (La Bohème), Silva, Zaccaria, Mephistopheles (Gounod and Berlioz), Fiesco (Simon Boccanegra), Talbot (Maria Stuarda) and Enrico (Anna Bolena). For Glyndebourne Festival Opera: Pogner (Die Meistersinger), Speaker (Die Zauberflöte), Fiesco. For Opera North: Philip II, Zaccaria and Leporello. For English National Opera: Colline, Harasta (The Cunning Little Vixen), Zaccaria, Silva, title role in Boito's Mefistofeles, Ford in Vaughan Williams' Sir John in Love and Alfonso d'Este ("Lucrezia Borgia"). For the Royal Opera House, Covent Garden: Colline, Lord Sidney (Rossini's Il Viaggio a Rheims), Sparafucile, Rodolfo (La Sonnambula), Elmiro (Rossini's Otello), Banquo (Macbeth), Brogni (La Juive), Poliferno (Niobe, regina di Tebe) and Dom Juam de Sylva in Donizetti's Dom Sebastien.

=== Concert performance ===
Alastair Miles has appeared with many conductors and orchestras including Giulini, Harnoncourt, Mazur, Muti, Chung, Rattle, Runnicles, Masur, Gergiev, Gardiner, Norrington, Davis and Dohnanyi. Recent projects have included performances of La Damnation de Faust, The Dream of Gerontius and Handel's Messiah with Davis and the LSO, Schumann's Faustszenen with Harnoncourt and the Royal Concertgebouw Orchestra, and Beethoven's Ninth Symphony with the San Francisco Symphony Orchestra under Tilson-Thomas.

=== Recording ===
His discography numbers more than 80 recordings including Verdi's Don Carlos, the songs of Richard Strauss, and the solo CD Great Operatic Arias for Chandos. He works with Opera Rara to bring neglected nineteenth century Italian and French Opera to a wider public. On that label he has recorded Ambroise Thomas' opera comique, La Cour de Célimène.
