= Niobe (Sophocles play) =

Lost play by Sophocles

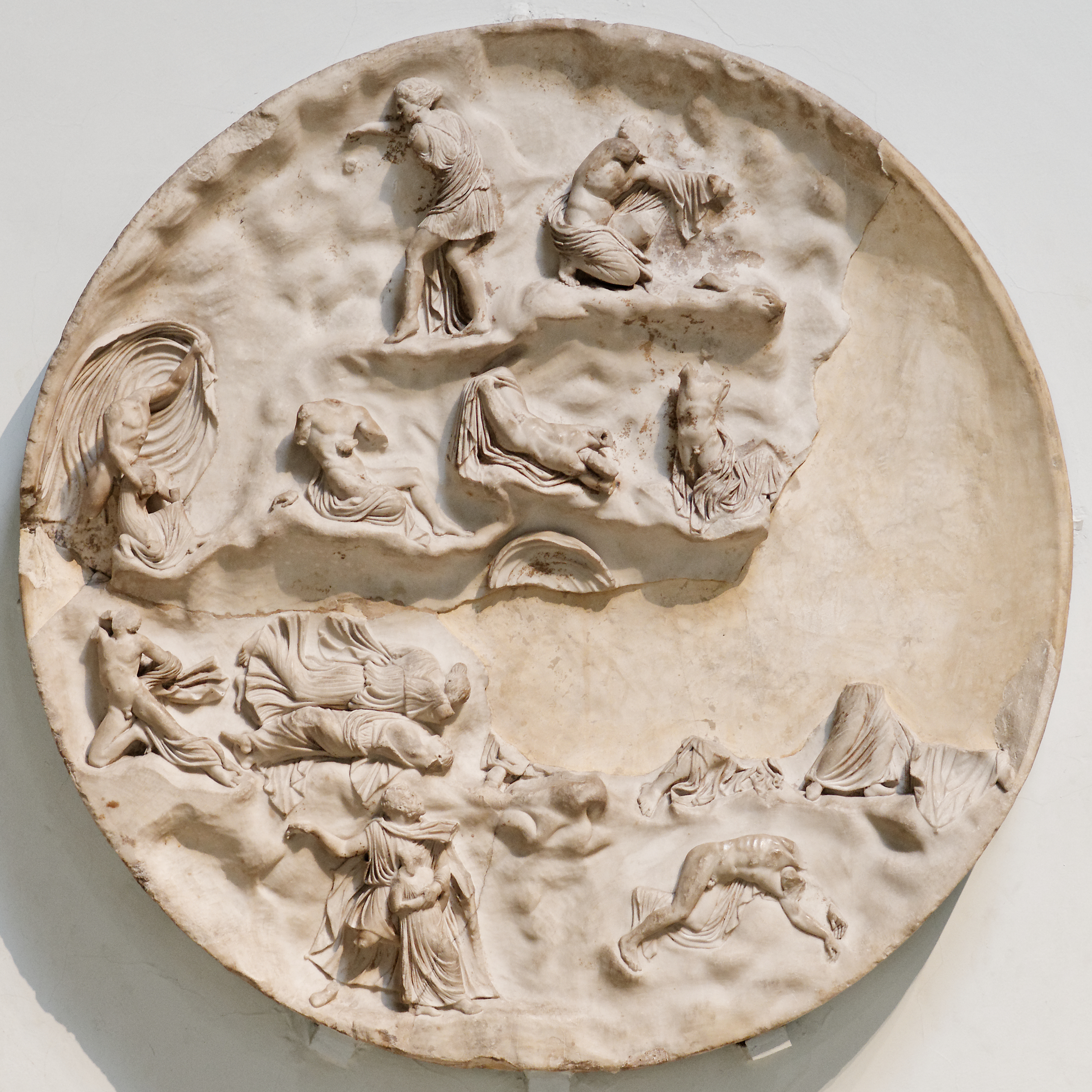
- Artemis and Apollo slay the Niobids on a first-century BC Roman relief tondo, British Museum
- Original language: Ancient Greek
- Written by: Sophocles
- Based on: The myth of Niobe
- Chorus: Theban people (?)
- Characters: Niobe; Niobids; Artemis; Apollo; Amphion and Zethus; Messenger (?)
- Genre: Tragedy
- Setting: Thebes, Greece

Premiere
- Date: 5th century BC
- Place: Athens

Niobe (Ancient Greek: Νιόβη, romanized: Nióbē) is a lost play by Sophocles, an ancient Athenian tragedian of the fifth century BC. It was performed during the City Dionysia, though very few fragments remain of it. The exact year of production cannot be determined, other than it was produced after Aeschylus' own play of the same name. The play was centered around the myth of the arrogant queen Niobe and how her blasphemous boast cost the lives of her children, the Niobids.

== Background ==
=== The classical myth ===
The story of Niobe is very old, recounted first in the Iliad, where Achilles says that Niobe boasted of being a more accomplished mother than the goddess Leto for having borne twelve children, while Leto only had two (Artemis and Apollo). And yet those two brought down Niobe’s twelve own with their arrows, leaving their mother in deep grief. Later writers add Amphion, king of Thebes, as Niobe's husband and father of the Niobids, and Tantalus as her father, though no author disputes those additions. Eventually, as all sources agree, Niobe was turned into a weeping rock in Mount Sipylus, near her homeland.

=== The play ===
The evidence based on which fragments are traditionally assigned to Sophocles' play can be dubious, though Sophocles' version can be distinguished from others as Aeschylus' Niobe was set entirely after the deaths of the children (whereas Sophocles' dealt directly with their demise), Euripides is not known to have written a play about Niobe at all, and it is very unlikely that fragments from a lesser tragedian have survived.

Unlike Homer, Sophocles gave the number of the children as fourteen (seven sons and seven daughters). The characters in the play were Niobe, the Niobids, Amphion, Artemis, Apollo, a messenger, and Amphion's twin brother Zethus, though not enough fragments remain to determine what the latter's role was. The chorus was likely made up of local Thebans; typically for Sophocles, the chorus is sympathetic to the protagonist's plight, but can offer no true help, and stays neutral.

== Plot ==
The play opened with Niobe boasting that she had the prettiest children the sun had ever seen, better even than Leto's, and then boasted again before sending the boys off to hunt with some other men, apparently their male erastai; within an ancient Greek context, it is logical that Sophocles presented the male Niobids as the young eromenoi of their older tutors. Both Plutarch and Athenaeus attest to the strong homoerotic elements of the play, to the point its alternative title might as well have been Paederastia ("love of boys").

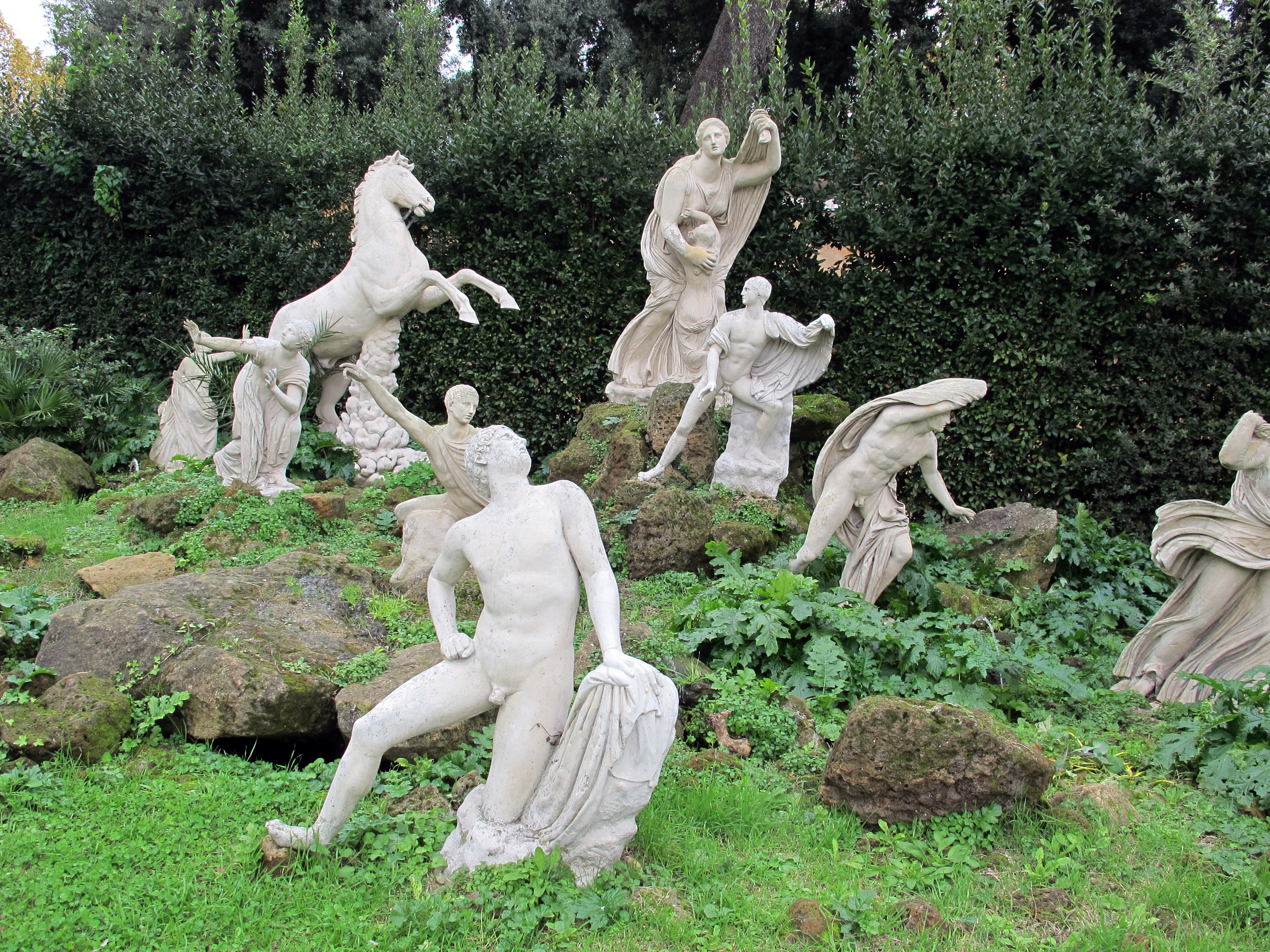
Death of the Niobids group in the gardens of Villa Medici.

What happens next is unclear, but we can conjecture that Apollo killed the boys as they hunted in the woods of Cithaeron, perhaps along with their erastai as well; the boys looked to their mature companions for protection, only to be killed in cold blood, a feature added to increase the pathos of their deaths. The boys' father, Amphion, seeing his sons dead challenged Apollo to a fight, and the god finished him off quickly.

The next fragments seems to deal with the murder of the girls; a speaker, who has to be Apollo, eggs on Artemis to kill the frightened girl who has sought shelter inside the cellar of the palace. Artemis then entered the palace, supposedly to finish off the rest of the girls, while dragging Niobe out of it, who asks the goddess to kill her instead. The chorus and Niobe then hear the last female child begging Artemis for mercy, unable to do anything as Niobe weeps.

As Niobe mourns her murdered progeny, the last of the daughters emerges from the palace, frightened but alive, as the chorus rejoices and then tries to calm her down and assure her that their woes are over. The variation that a daughter (and sometimes a son as well) was spared was already attested in Telesilla, and Sophocles perhaps chose to portray that version in order to differentiate his version from those of his predecessors, including Aeschylus (in whose play no child survives). The surviving girl in later authors is identified as Meliboea, whose name was then changed to Chloris (“pale”) due to her fright.

The final lines of Niobe are not preserved, so it is not known exactly how the play ended; it did follow the tradition of Niobe's return to her fatherland Lydia (a region in northwestern Asia Minor), but a drastic change of scenery from Thebes to Lydia is unlikely; it is more probable that a god or Niobe herself announced her departure. If later accounts where Niobe prays for release are to be considered, Sophocles' heroine might have done the same.

== Staging ==
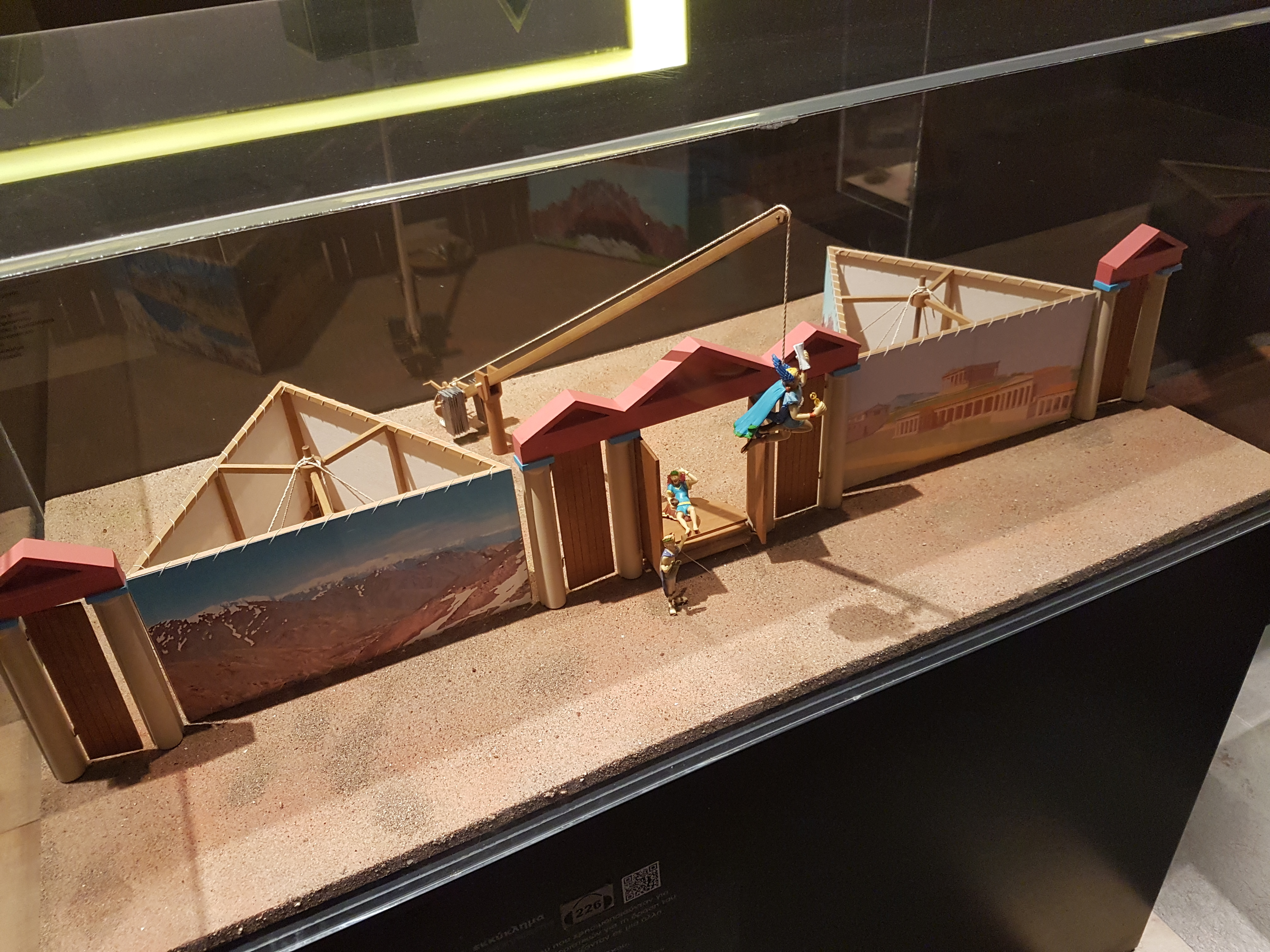
Model of a fifth-century BC mechane.

A much-debated point of the lost play is how the production looked like, particularly the killing of the Niobids. Sophocles included fourteen children for the unfortunate queen, and they probably appeared alive at some point and even had speaking parts, but no more than three actors and the chorus could be on stage at any point. While the chorus being a character of its own is not unprecedented, the chorus being killed off during the production would have been an extraordinary case. Perhaps the children (and the boys' erastai) formed a secondary chorus. Sutton thinks that the children were silent, and at best formed a secondary chorus, without the lovers given how crowded the stage would get. The murders pose another problem; due to evidence of hunting activity, the murder of the boys and that of the girls had to be separate episodes, but if the boys' murder happened on stage it required a change of scenery or else the deaths of the sons (and Amphion) would have to be announced to Niobe by a messenger.

What followed next was the death of the girls. The surviving lines show that Apollo and Artemis had a good view and aim, perhaps on the flying-machine, but it is also clear they could also see the palace's interior. Wright and Kalamara suggest that the two actors portraying the gods would be standing on top of the stage (the roof of the palace in this case), but their victims would be out of the audience's sight, with only cries of pain indicating their fate, in line with ancient Greek theater not allowing on-stage depictions of violence; nevertheless the impact of such a scene would have been considerable to the Greeks watching. Wright observes that some fragments seem to imply that Artemis did shoot a girl on stage, who would have been on full view, though in this case a problem arises on whether Sophocles had to hire a skilled archer, and how he overcame the hazardous challenge of a character shooting real arrows within close range of the actors and the audience alike without harming anyone. He also notes that despite the ancient Greek taboo against theatrical on-stage violence, existing evidence show that Sophocles did break those rules in this instance, perhaps even twice on account of the two murder episodes of the play. Sutton thinks that the girl's corpse was brought out with the roll-out machine, or that Artemis' actor simply pointed his bow inside the door of the palace.

== See also ==
- Phaethon
- The Bacchae
- Amaleus

== Bibliography ==
- Apollodorus, The Library, with an English Translation by Sir James George Frazer, F.B.A., F.R.S. in 2 Volumes. Cambridge, MA, Harvard University Press; London, William Heinemann Ltd. 1921. Online version at the Perseus Digital Library.
- Athenaeus, The Deipnosophists or Banquet Of The Learned Of Athenaeus, translated into English by C. D. Yonge. London. Henry G. Bohn, York Street, Covent Garden. 1854. Available on Perseus Digital Library.
- Gantz, Timothy (1996). Early Greek Myth: A Guide to Literary and Artistic Sources. Vol. II. Johns Hopkins University Press. ISBN 978-0-8018-5362-3.
- Hathorn, Richmond Y. (1967). Crowell's Handbook to Classical Drama. NYC, United States: Thomas Y. Crowell Company. ISBN 0-690-22501-6.
- Homer, The Iliad with an English Translation by A. T. Murray, PhD in two volumes. Cambridge, MA., Harvard University Press; London, William Heinemann, Ltd. 1924. Online version at the Perseus Digital Library.
- Lloyd-Jones, Hugh (1996). Sophocles: Fragments. Loeb Classical Library 483. Cambridge, MA: Harvard University Press. ISBN 978-0-674-99532-1.
- Kalamara, Zoe (2017). Ο μύθος της Νιόβης στις ομώνυμες τραγωδίες του Αισχύλου και του Σοφοκλή [The Myth of Niobe in the Homonymous Tragedies of Aeschylus and Sophocles] (PDF) (Thesis) (in Greek). Thessaloniki, Greece: Aristotle University of Thessaloniki.
- Pausanias, Description of Greece with an English Translation by W.H.S. Jones, Litt.D., and H.A. Ormerod, M.A., in 4 Volumes. Cambridge, MA, Harvard University Press; London, William Heinemann Ltd. 1918. Online version at the Perseus Digital Library.
- Plutarch, Amatorius in Plutarch's Moralia, translated from the Greek by several hands. Corrected and revised by. William W. Goodwin, PH. D. Boston. Little, Brown, and Company. Cambridge. Press Of John Wilson and son. 1874. 4. Available on Perseus Digital Library.
- Sutton, Dana F. (1984). The Lost Sophocles. University Press of America. ISBN 0-8191-4030-9.
- Wright, Matthew (2019). The Lost Plays of Greek Tragedy. Vol. 2: Aeschylus, Sophocles and Euripides. London, UK: Bloomsbury Academic. ISBN 978-1-4742-7646-7.
