= Niobe, regina di Tebe =

Niobe, regina di Tebe is an opera in three acts by Agostino Steffani, premiered at Salvatortheater, the Munich court theatre on 5 January 1688, during the carnival season . It is a tragedy focusing on the Ancient Greek character of Niobe. The libretto is by Luigi Orlandi, after Ovid's Metamorphoses. The score is in the National Library in Vienna. Excerpts have been published in Riemann Ausgewählte Werke iii. Long neglected, the opera was revived at Alice Tully Hall in New York City by the Clarion Music Society in 1977. More recently the work was mounted in Schwetzingen in 2008, in London in 2010, and in Boston in 2011.

== Roles ==
Role	Voice type	Premiere cast, 5 January 1688 Conductor:-
Niobe, Queen of Thebes, brave but arrogant; punished by the gods for her pride	Soprano	Unknown
Anfione, King of Thebes; abdicates in favor of his wife Niobe; returns to protect Thebes from attack	Soprano Castrato	Unknown
Manto, Theban girl, priestess to the goddess Latona; falls in love with Tiberino	Soprano	Unknown
Tiresia, blind Theban seer and priest of Latona, Manto’s father; warns Niobe that her pride will anger the gods	Bass	Unknown
Clearte, prince and advisor to Anfione; secretly in love with Niobe	Tenor	Unknown
Creonte, Thessalonian prince bewitched into helping Poliferno attack Thebes	Alto Castrato	Unknown
Poliferno, magician; harbors a grudge against Anfione and sets out to overthrow him	Bass	Unknown
Tiberino, Prince of Alba; dreams of conquering Thebes; falls in love with Manto	Tenor	Unknown
Nerea, nurse to Niobe; advises the main characters	Contralto	Unknown

== Recordings ==
Year	Cast: Niobe, Anfione, Manto, Tiresia, Clearte, Creonte, Poliferno, Tiberino, Nerea	Conductor, Opera House and Orchestra	Label
2013	Karina Gauvin, Philippe Jaroussky, Amanda Forsythe, Christian Immler, Aaron Sheehan, Terry Wey, Jesse Blumberg, Colin Balzer, José Lemos	Paul O’Dette and Stephen Stubbs, Boston Early Music Festival Orchestra	CD: Erato; Cat: 0825646343546
2010	Veronique Gens, Jacek Laszczkowski, Amanda Forsythe, Bruno Taddia, Tim Mead, Iestyn Davies, Alastair Miles, Lothar Odinius, Delphine Galou	Thomas Hengelbrock, Balthasar-Neumann-Ensemble, recorded at the Royal Opera House	CD: Opus Arte
