= Niobe (Paulton play) =

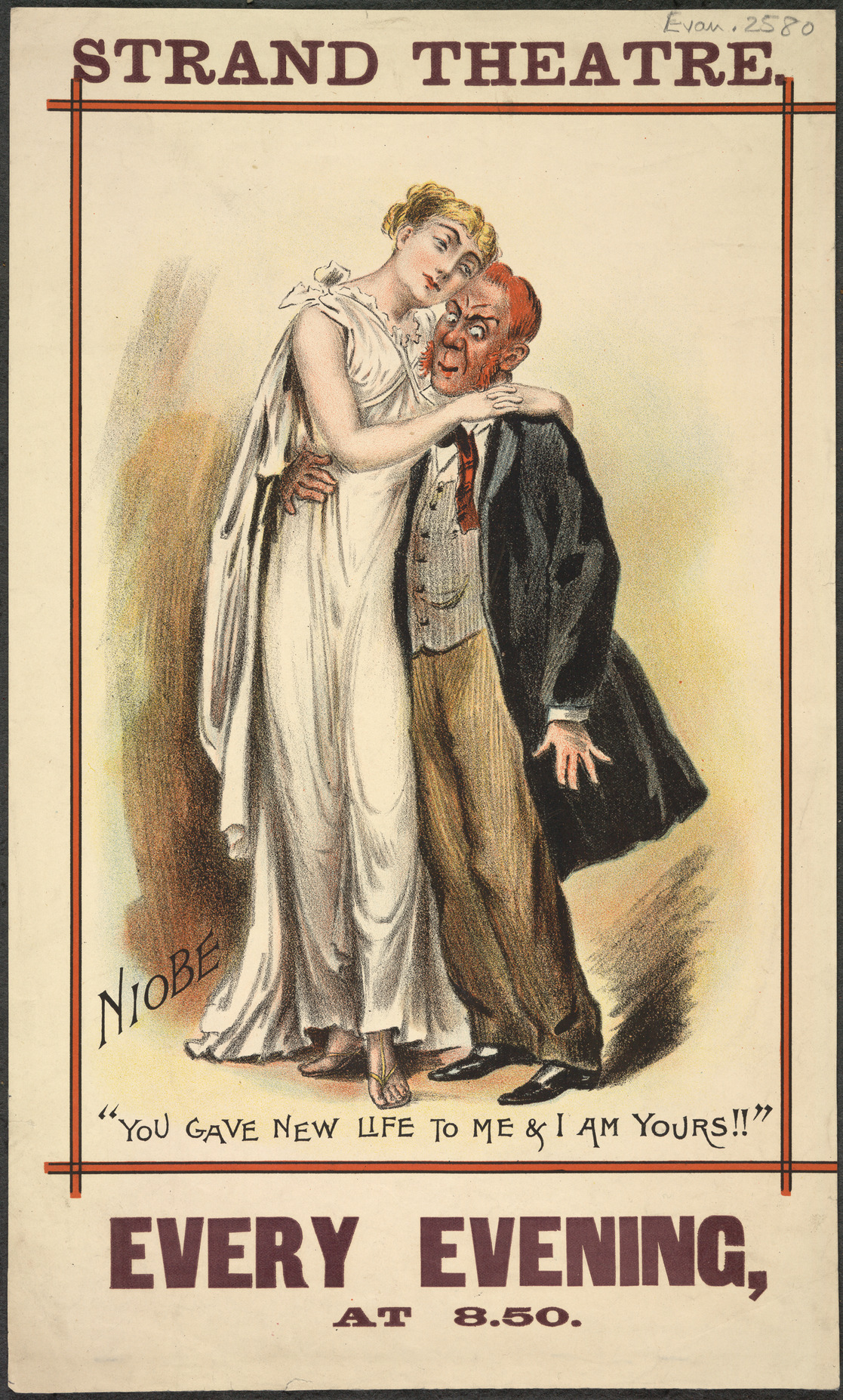
A Royal Strand Theatre poster for the play Niobe

Niobe, also known as Niobe: All Smiles, is a farce written by Harry Paulton in 1892. The show had more than five hundred performances at the Royal Strand Theatre in London's West End. The play toured other countries, including Australia and with other companies

== Plot ==
The play revolves around the Edwardian family values being tested by unusual circumstances. The household contains a marble statue of Niobe. The moment of magical transformation occurs as the statue is bought to life by a quaint electrical storm.
