= Pierre-Charles Jombert =

French painter

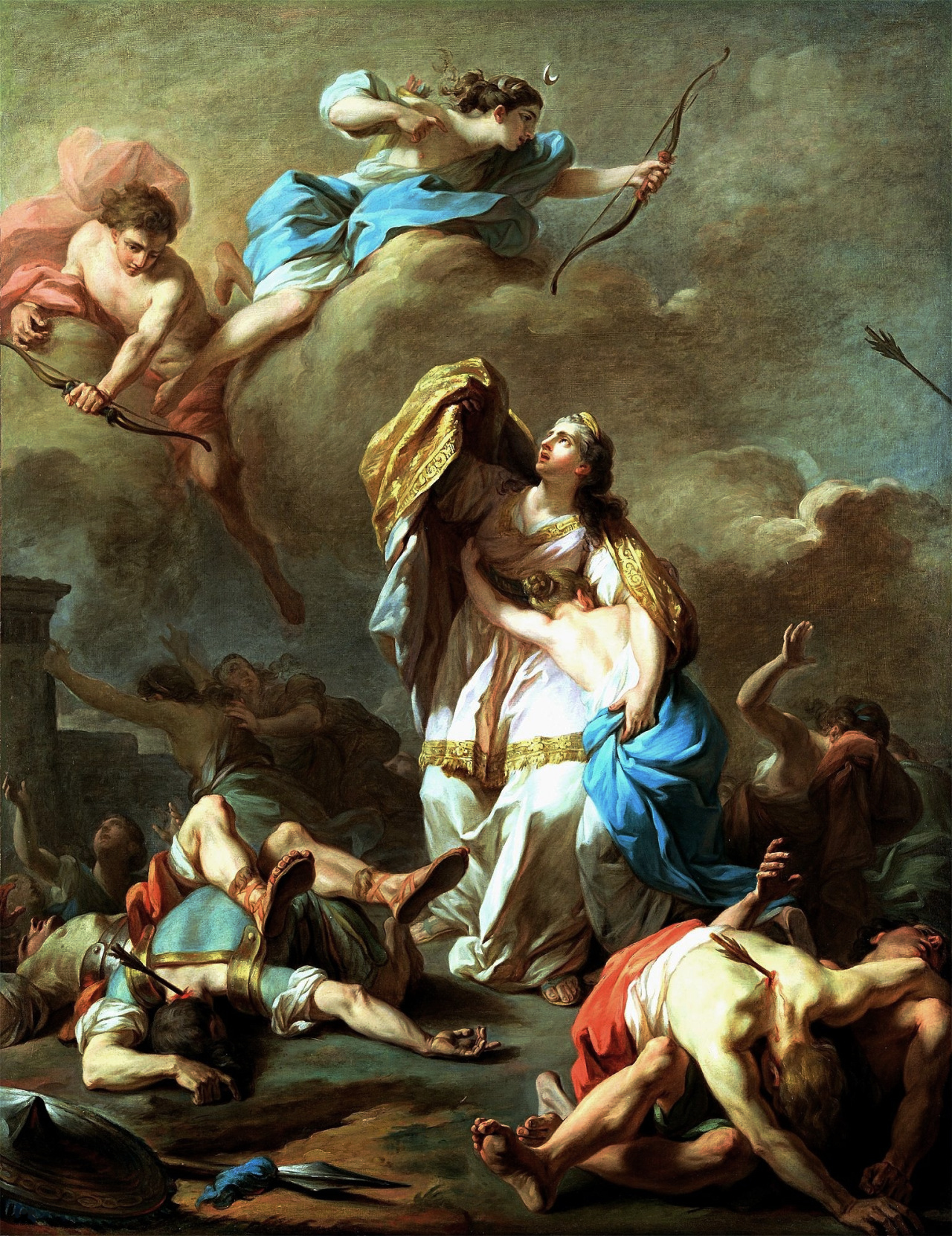
The Punishment of the Arrogant Niobe by Diana and Apollo by Pierre-Charles Jombert, École nationale supérieure des Beaux-Arts, 1772

Pierre-Charles Jombert (1748–1825) was a French painter.

Jombert is primarily known through his works. He took first prize of the Prix de Rome in 1772 for his work The Punishment of the Arrogant Niobe by Diana and Apollo. The oil sketch of this work resides at the Metropolitan Museum of Art, while the larger finished painting can be found at the École nationale supérieure des Beaux-Arts.
