= Assaon =

Father of Niobe

In Greek mythology, Assaon (Ancient Greek: Ἀσσάων, romanized: Assáōn), also called Assonides (Ancient Greek: Ἀσσωνίδης, romanized: Assōnídēs), is in some versions the father of Niobe, the woman who insulted Leto by comparing her children to the goddess'. Assaon features in a lesser-known version of the myth, which is perhaps of Lydian origin, where he tries to marry Niobe and kills her children when his plans fail.

Assaon's story is best known from its inclusion in the Sorrows of Love, a love story collection by Parthenius of Nicaea.

== Family ==
Assaon or Assonides is the father of Niobe, although in more common versions she is the daughter of Tantalus instead.

== Mythology ==
In the most common accounts, Niobe was the wife of Amphion and queen of Thebes. She and Amphion had many children together, usually twelve or fourteen, equally divided among sons and daughters. Happy with her many children, Niobe foolishly claimed to be a better mother than the goddess Leto herself, who only had two children, Artemis and Apollo. Gravely insulted, Leto asked her son and daughter to avenge her, and they proceeded to do so by shooting all of Niobe's children dead. She then transformed into a weeping stone near Mount Sipylus.

In a very different version provided by Parthenius and some scholiasts, Niobe was the wife of the Assyrian Philottus and she clashed with Leto over the beauty of their children. Leto's punishment was quick; Philottus was killed during hunting by a bear, while Assaon was consumed with strong desire for his own daughter. He tried to seduce her only for her to rebuff his attempts every time. Eventually Assaon invited the Niobids (here twenty in number) to a banquet, where he set them all afire. Learning that, Niobe flung herself from a rock, or alternatively turned into stone or ice, while Assaon was left to contemplate his sins. He too killed himself then.

== Analysis ==
Niobe's tale has several variations in regards to the number of children, the manner of their deaths or Niobe's exact metamorphosis, but are all centered around a core theme of the mortal queen comparing her children to Leto's. The various versions seem to have evolved from two prime lines of development, a Theban and an Anatolian one, possibly Lydian; Assaon seems to have sprung from the Anatolian variant. In connection to that, Niobe and Amphion have both been described as 'interpolations' in the mythology of Thebes due to Niobe's Anatolian roots and Amphion being both preceded and succeeded to the throne of Thebes by the line of Cadmus, his own line not keeping the rulership of the city.

Parthenius attributes the version he recorded to Xanthus of Lydia, Neanthes of Cyzicus and Simmias of Rhodes, with Xanthus apparently being the one he follows the most; however Xanthus seems to have had Niobe turned to stone or ice, not throwing herself from a rock. Perhaps Parthenius probably sought sources that combined versions in order to rationalise the myth.

== See also ==
- Amaleus
- Larissa
- Ictinus
- Thyestes

== Bibliography ==
- Avery, Catherine B., ed. (1962). New Century Classical Handbook. New York, US: Appleton-Century-Crofts.
- Fontenrose, Joseph Eddy (1948). "The Sorrows of Ino and Procne". Transactions and Proceedings of the American Philological Association. 79. Johns Hopkins University Press: 125–167. doi:10.2307/283358. JSTOR 283358.
- Gallé Cejudo, Rafael (January 31, 2021). "Hellenistic Poetry in the Augustan Age: the Metapoetic Prose of Parthenius of Nicaea". In Maria Cristina Pimentel; Ana Maria Lóio; Nuno Simões Rodrigues; Rodrigo Furtado (eds.). Augustan Papers: New Approaches to the Age of Augustus on the Bimillennium of his Death. Vol. 1. Georg Olms Verlag. ISBN 978-3-487-15816-7.
- Grimal, Pierre (1987). The Dictionary of Classical Mythology. Wiley-Blackwell. ISBN 0-631-13209-0.
- Homer, The Iliad with an English Translation by A.T. Murray, PhD in two volumes. Cambridge, MA., Harvard University Press; London, William Heinemann, Ltd. 1924. Online version at the Perseus Digital Library.
- Michels, Johanna Astrid (2022). Agenorid Myth in the ›Bibliotheca‹ of Pseudo-Apollodorus. De Gruyter. ISBN 9783110602791.
- Parthenius, Love Romances translated by Sir Stephen Gaselee (1882–1943), S. Loeb Classical Library Volume 69. Cambridge, MA. Harvard University Press. 1916. Online version at the Topos Text Project.
- Smith, William (1873). A Dictionary of Greek and Roman Biography and Mythology. London, UK: John Murray, printed by Spottiswoode and Co. Online version at the Perseus.tufts library.
- Tripp, Edward (June 1970). Crowell's Handbook of Classical Mythology (1st ed.). Thomas Y. Crowell Co. ISBN 069022608X.
- van Tress, Heather (July 31, 2017). Poetic Memory: Allusion in the Poetry of Callimachus and the Metamorphoses of Ovid. Leiden, the Netherlands: BRILL. ISBN 978-90-04-14157-5.
