= Amaleus =

Male Niobid

- Prince of Thebes
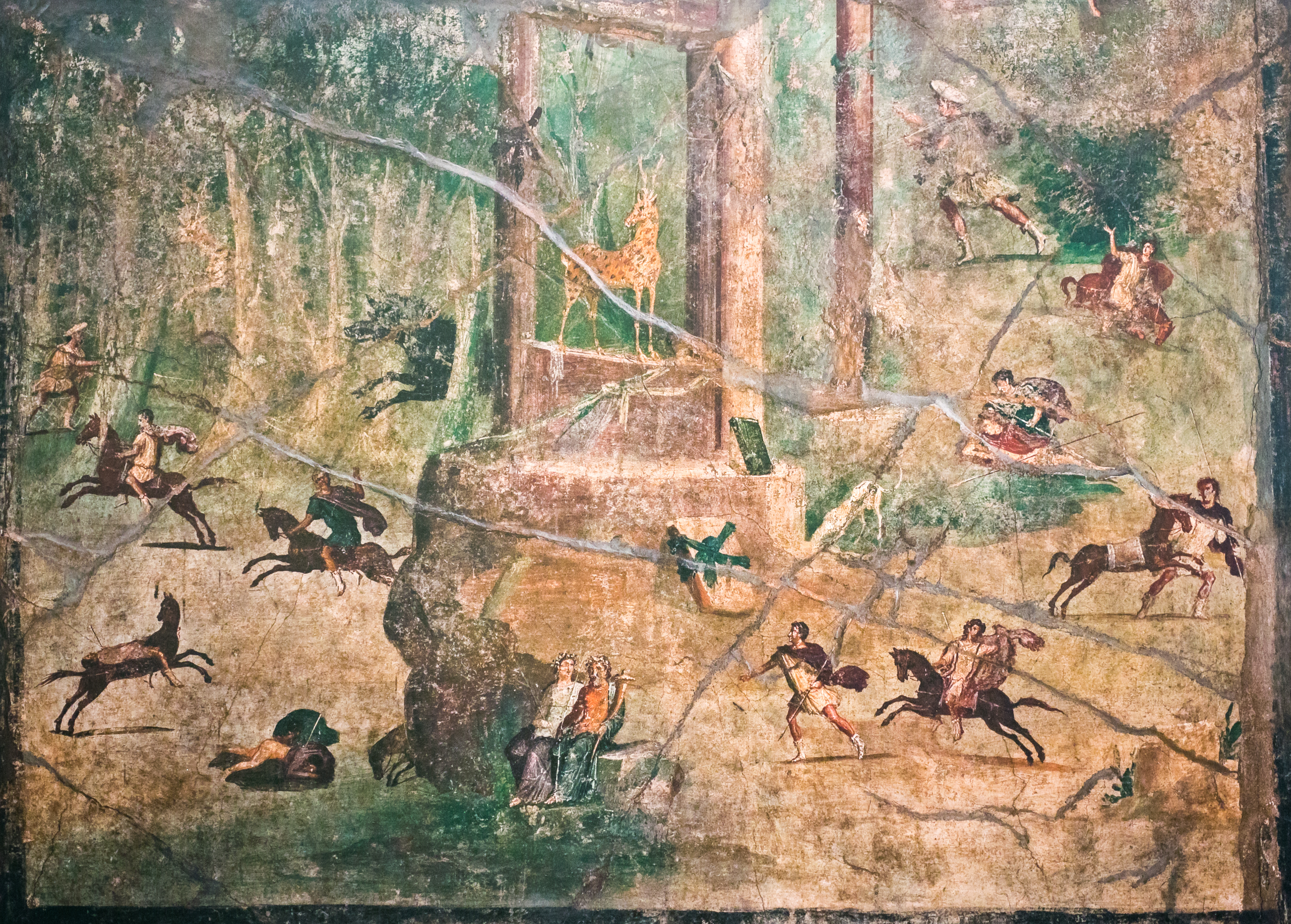
- Artemis and Apollo kill the fleeing Niobids, Roman fresco from Pompeii, 1st c. BC - 1st c. AD.
- Region: Thebes, Greece

Genealogy
- Parents: Amphion (father); Niobe (mother)
- Siblings: Niobids

In Greek mythology, Amaleus (Ancient Greek: Ἀμαλεύς, romanized: Amaleús) is the name of the eldest of the Niobids, the twelve or fourteen children of Amphion, king of Thebes, by his wife Queen Niobe. The Niobids are primarily notable for the myth of Niobe's blasphemous boast against the goddess Leto about being a more successful mother than her for having more children. Leto's offspring, the deities Artemis and Apollo, punished the queen by shooting all of her children dead; Apollo killed the boys.

Although the sons and daughters of Niobe are not typically individually characterised, Amaleus has a unique appearance of his own in myth, where an attempt on his life was made by his aunt, Aëdon, wife to his father's brother.

== Etymology ==
The ancient Greek proper name Ἀμαλεύς might be connected to the Greek noun ἀμαλός (amalós), meaning 'soft'. A son of Amphion named Homoloeus (Ancient Greek: Ὁμολωεύς, romanized: Homolōeús) appears as an eponym in a scholium on Euripides.

== Mythology ==
=== Aëdon ===
Amaleus had many siblings and only one cousin, Itylus, the son of his uncle Zethus by his wife, Aëdon. All the Niobids but especially Amaleus got along greatly with cousin Itylus; the two boys slept together in the same room and, in some accounts, bed. However Aëdon deeply resented Niobe for having borne so many children while she only had one, so she conceived a plan to kill Amaleus, who was the firstborn child.

Aëdon carefully instructed Itylus to sleep in the back of the room, or in the innermost position of the bed that night, but Itylus forgot about his mother's orders when night fell. So that night when Aëdon crept up into the room wielding a dagger and planning to murder the unsuspecting Amaleus, she ended up killing her own child Itylus instead, not recognising him in the darkness. In another version Aëdon did succeed in killing Amaleus, but immediately took the life of her own son as well, in fear of Niobe's reaction.

=== Niobe's boast ===
In the most known myth concerning the Niobids, Amaleus' mother Niobe was exceedingly proud of the vast progeny she had produced for her husband. In a tale that goes as far back as the Iliad, she hubristically boasted of being a greater mother than the goddess Leto herself, for she had many children (usually twelve or fourteen, equally divided between sons and daughters), while Leto only had two. Leto did not let the insult go, so she informed her two children, the archer gods Artemis and Apollo, and they took matters in their own hands; with their bows and arrows they slew all the Niobids one by one to avenge their mother's honour.

It was said that the boys, whom Apollo slew, were killed while they were hunting in the woods. Their father, Amphion, committed suicide in grief at the sight of the lifeless bodies of his sons, or was slain by Apollo while storming his temple in protest. Niobe herself would be transformed into rock following the slaying of the daughters. In some versions of the tale, a single child, Meliboea (thereafter renamed Chloris) was spared, or two children, one of each sex, Chloris and her brother Amyclas. In a rarer version, Niobe's father, named Assaon instead, fell in love with Niobe, but she would not yield to his incestuous embraces, so he invited all her children to a banquet and burnt them all to death in revenge.

== Analysis ==
Those two narratives concerning Amaleus have a lot in common beyond being connected to Niobe. In both, a woman with few children (a boy and a girl even) is threatened by Niobe and her vast progeny and thus becomes her rival, whose method of revenge is to bring harm to one or more Niobids. Leto being a goddess however means she is successful in punishing Niobe, while Aëdon, who is a mortal, fails and her efforts result in tragedy.

== See also ==
Other instances of a mother (nearly) dooming her children:

- Cassiopeia
- Telephus and Auge
- Itys

== Bibliography ==
- Apollodorus, Apollodorus, The Library, with an English Translation by Sir James George Frazer, F.B.A., F.R.S. in 2 Volumes. Cambridge, MA, Harvard University Press; London, William Heinemann Ltd. 1921. Online version at the Perseus Digital Library.
- Avery, Catherine B., ed. (1962). New Century Classical Handbook. New York, US: Appleton-Century-Crofts.
- Bell, Robert E. (1991). Women of Classical Mythology: A Biographical Dictionary. ABC-Clio. ISBN 9780874365818. Online version at Internet Archive.
- Diodorus Siculus (1939). Library of History. Loeb Classical Library 340. Vol. III: Books 4.59-8. Translated by C. H. Oldfather. Cambridge, MA: Harvard University Press. ISBN 9780674993754.
- Eustathius (1825). Eustathii, archiepiscopi thessalonicensis commentarii ad Homeri Odysseam. Vol. 1–2. sumptibus J. A. G. Weigel.
- Fontenrose, Joseph Eddy (1948). "The Sorrows of Ino and Procne". Transactions and Proceedings of the American Philological Association. 79. Johns Hopkins University Press: 125–167. doi:10.2307/283358. JSTOR 283358.
- Grimal, Pierre (1987). The Dictionary of Classical Mythology. Translated by A. R. Maxwell-Hyslop. New York, USA: Wiley-Blackwell. ISBN 0-631-13209-0.
- Hadjopoulos, Odysseus, ed. (2003). Euripides: Fragments (in Greek). Vol. 2: Antigone-Erechtheus. Translated by Cactus Philology Team. Athens, Greece: Cactus Editions. ISBN 960-382-515-8.
- Hansen, William F. (2002). Ariadne's Thread: A Guide to International Tales Found in Classical Literature. UK, USA: Cornell University Press. ISBN 0-8014-3670-2.
- Homer, The Iliad with an English Translation by A.T. Murray, PhD in two volumes. Cambridge, MA., Harvard University Press; London, William Heinemann, Ltd. 1924. Online version at the Perseus Digital Library.
- Hyginus, Gaius Julius, The Myths of Hyginus. Edited and translated by Mary A. Grant, Lawrence: University of Kansas Press, 1960.
- Levaniouk, Olga (2011). "12: Aëdon". Eve of the Festival: Making Myth in Odyssey 19. Hellenic Studies Series 46. Washington, DC: Center for Hellenic Studies.
- Ovid, Metamorphoses, Brookes More, Boston, Cornhill Publishing Co. 1922. Online version at the Perseus Digital Library.
- Parthenius (2010). "Suffering in Love". In J. L. Lightfoot (ed.). Hellenistic Collection: Philitas. Alexander of Aetolia. Hermesianax. Euphorion. Parthenius. Loeb Classical Library 508. Translated by J. L. Lightfoot. Cambridge, MA: Harvard University Press. ISBN 9780674996366.
- Pausanias, Pausanias Description of Greece with an English Translation by W.H.S. Jones, Litt.D., and H.A. Ormerod, M.A., in 4 Volumes. Cambridge, MA, Harvard University Press; London, William Heinemann Ltd. 1918. Online version at the Perseus Digital Library.
- Stoll, Heinrich Wilhem (1886). Wilhelm Heinrich Roscher (ed.). Ausführliches Lexikon der griechischen und römischen Mythologie [Detailed Lexicon of Greek and Roman Mythology] (in German). Vol. 1. Leipzig, Germany.
- Thraemer, Eduard (1894). Realencyclopädie der classischen Altertumswissenschaft [Real encyclopedia of classical ancient science] (in German). Vol. I, 2. Stuttgart, Germany.
- Tripp, Edward (June 1970). Crowell's Handbook of Classical Mythology (1st ed.). Thomas Y. Crowell Co. ISBN 069022608X.
