= HMS Niobe =

Four ships of the Royal Navy have borne the name HMS Niobe, after the figure of Niobe in Greek mythology:

- HMS Niobe was a 38-gun fifth-rate, formerly the French frigate Diane, which the Royal Navy captured in 1800; Niobe was broken up in 1816.
- HMS Niobe (1849) was a 28-gun sixth rate launched in 1849 and sold to the Prussian Navy in 1862.
- HMS Niobe (1866) was a wood screw sloop launched in 1866 and wrecked in 1874.
- HMS Niobe (1897) was a Diadem-class protected cruiser launched in 1897. She was transferred to the Royal Canadian Navy in 1910, used as a depot ship from 1915 and was broken up in 1922.
