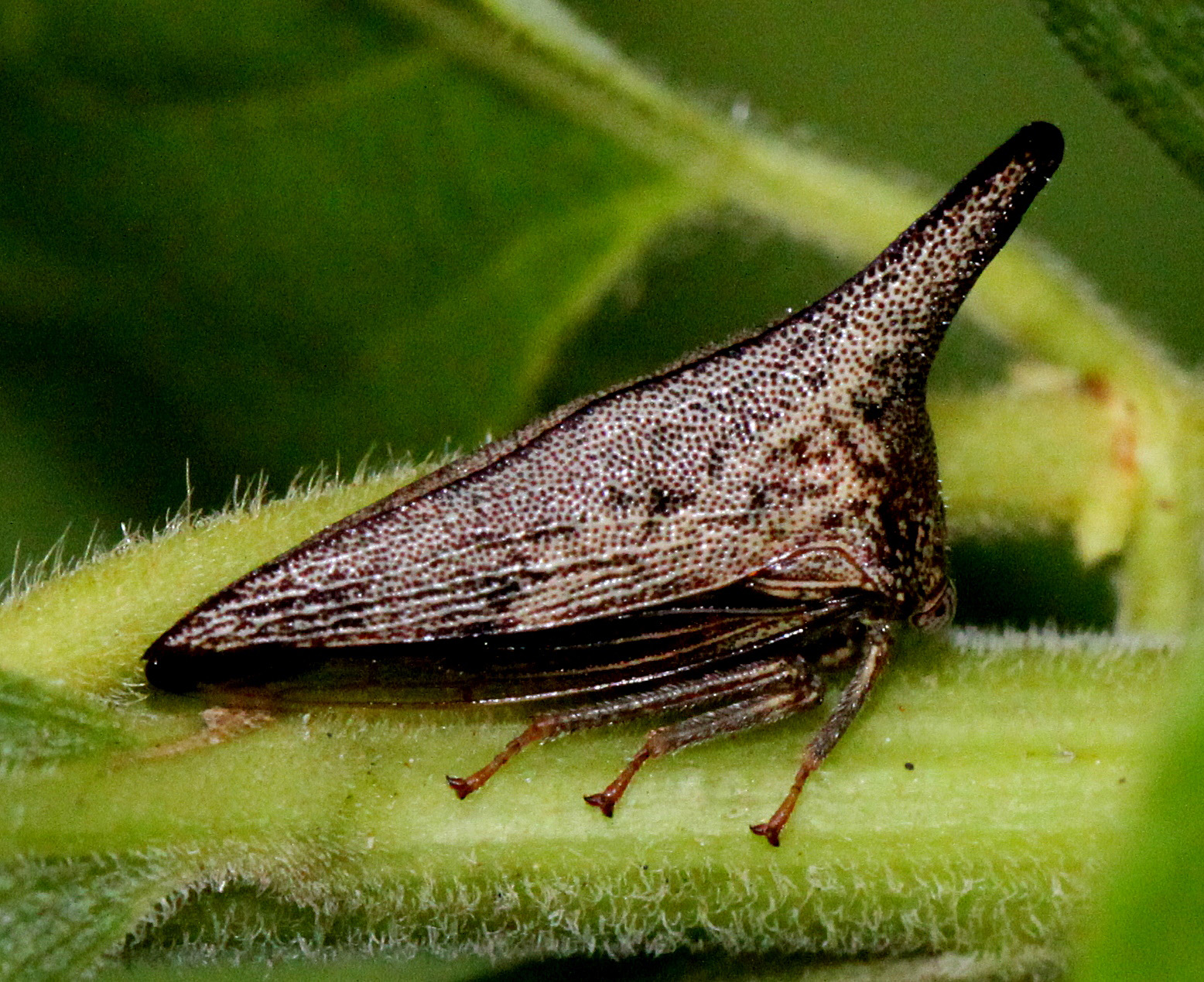

Scientific classification
- Kingdom: Animalia
- Phylum: Arthropoda
- Class: Insecta
- Order: Hemiptera
- Suborder: Auchenorrhyncha
- Family: Membracidae
- Genus: Thelia
- Species: T. uhleri

Binomial name
- Thelia uhleri Stål

= Thelia uhleri =

Species of true bug

Thelia uhleri is a species of treehopper in the family Membracidae.
