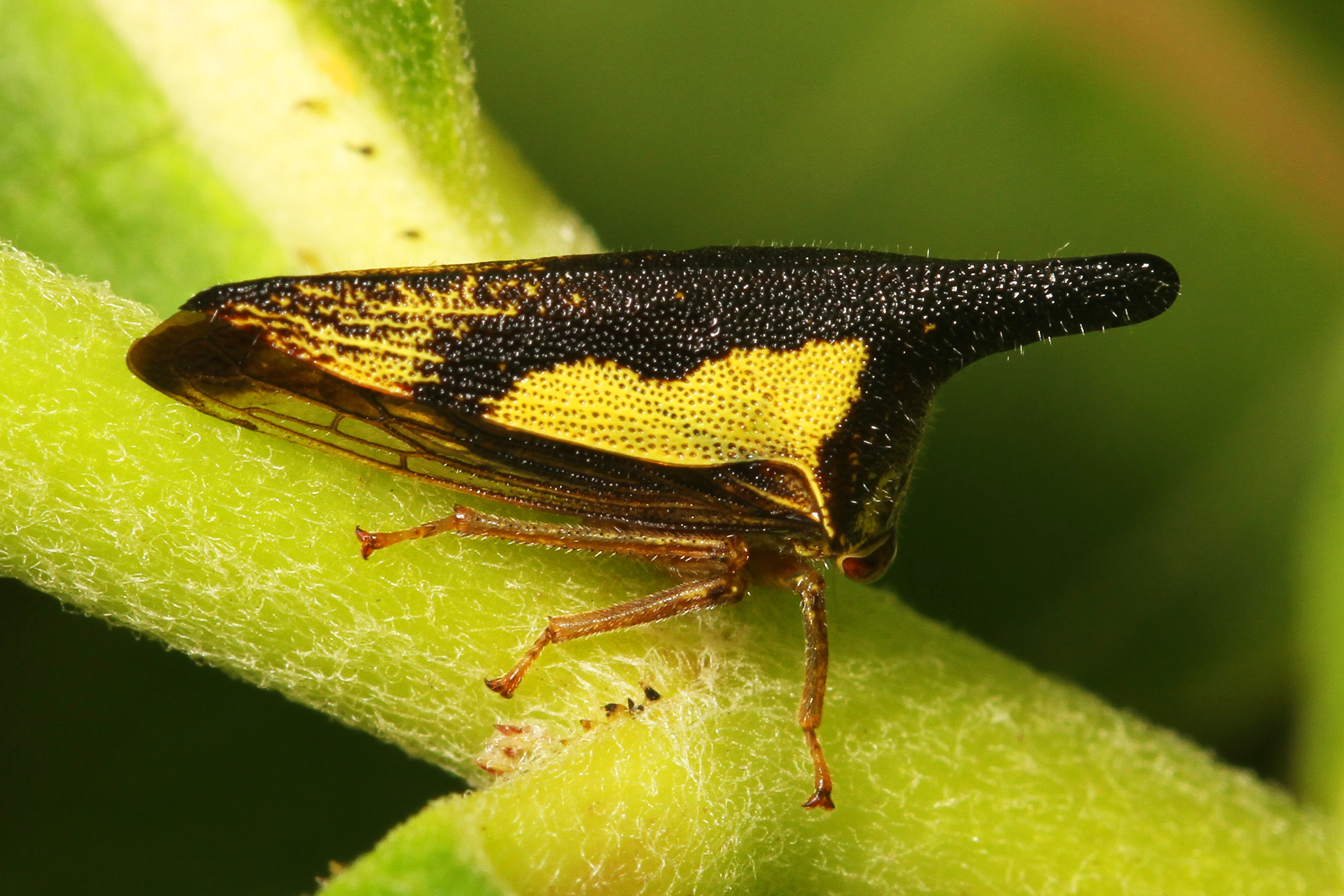
- Thelia bimaculata

Scientific classification
- Domain: Eukaryota
- Kingdom: Animalia
- Phylum: Arthropoda
- Class: Insecta
- Order: Hemiptera
- Suborder: Auchenorrhyncha
- Family: Membracidae
- Tribe: Telamonini
- Genus: Thelia; Amyot & Serville, 1843

= Thelia =

Genus of true bugs

Thelia is a genus of treehoppers in the family Membracidae. There are at least two described species in Thelia.

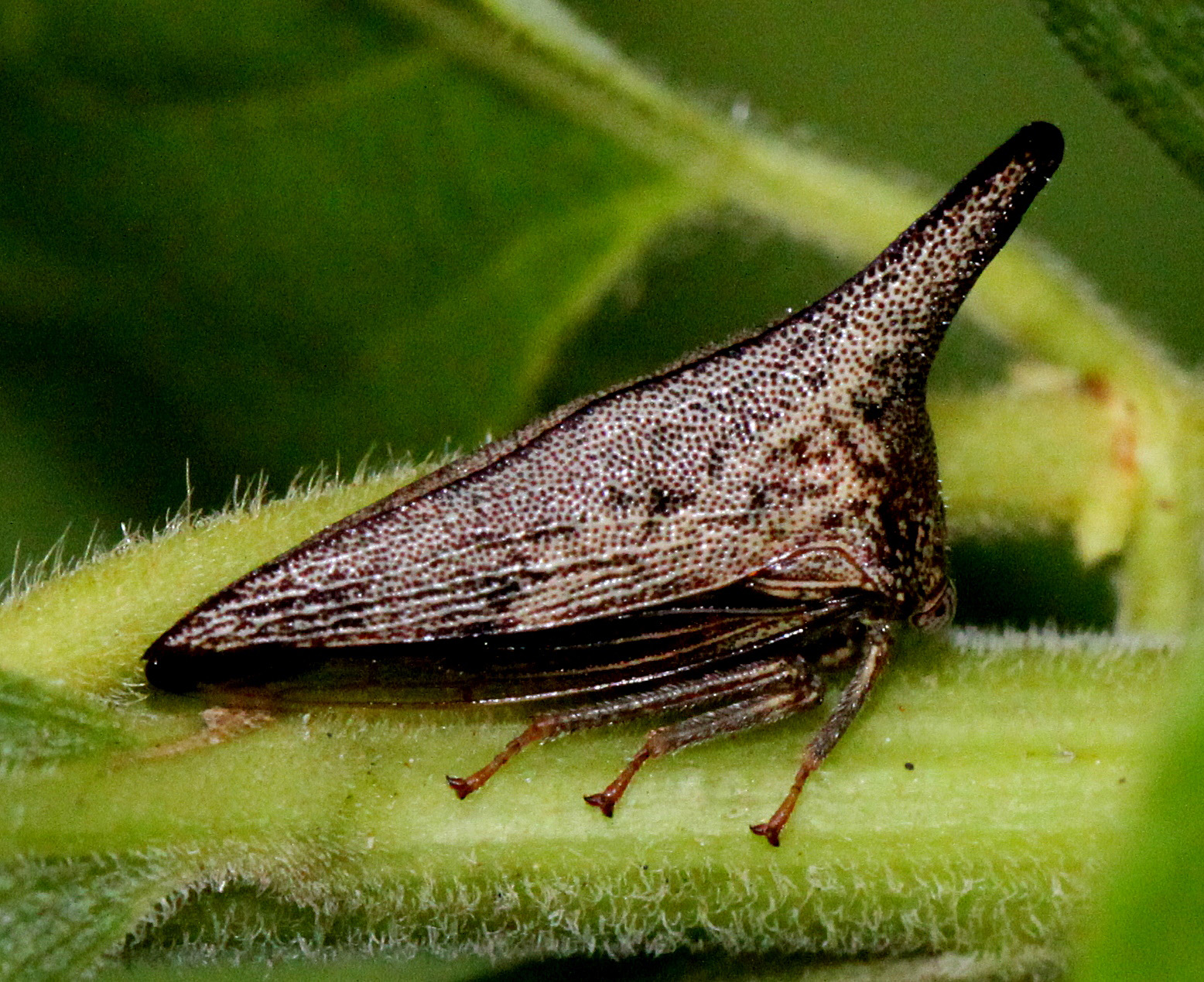
Thelia uhleri

== Species ==
These two species belong to the genus Thelia:

- Thelia bimaculata Fabricius^{c g b} (locust treehopper)
- Thelia uhleri Stål^{c g b}

Data sources: i = ITIS, c = Catalogue of Life, g = GBIF, b = Bugguide.net
