= Archasia auriculata =

Scientific classification
- Kingdom: Animalia
- Phylum: Arthropoda
- Class: Insecta
- Order: Hemiptera
- Suborder: Auchenorrhyncha
- Family: Membracidae
- Genus: Archasia
- Species: A. auriculata

Binomial name
- Archasia auriculata (Fitch, 1851)

Species of insect

Archasia auriculata is a species of treehopper in the family Membracidae.
