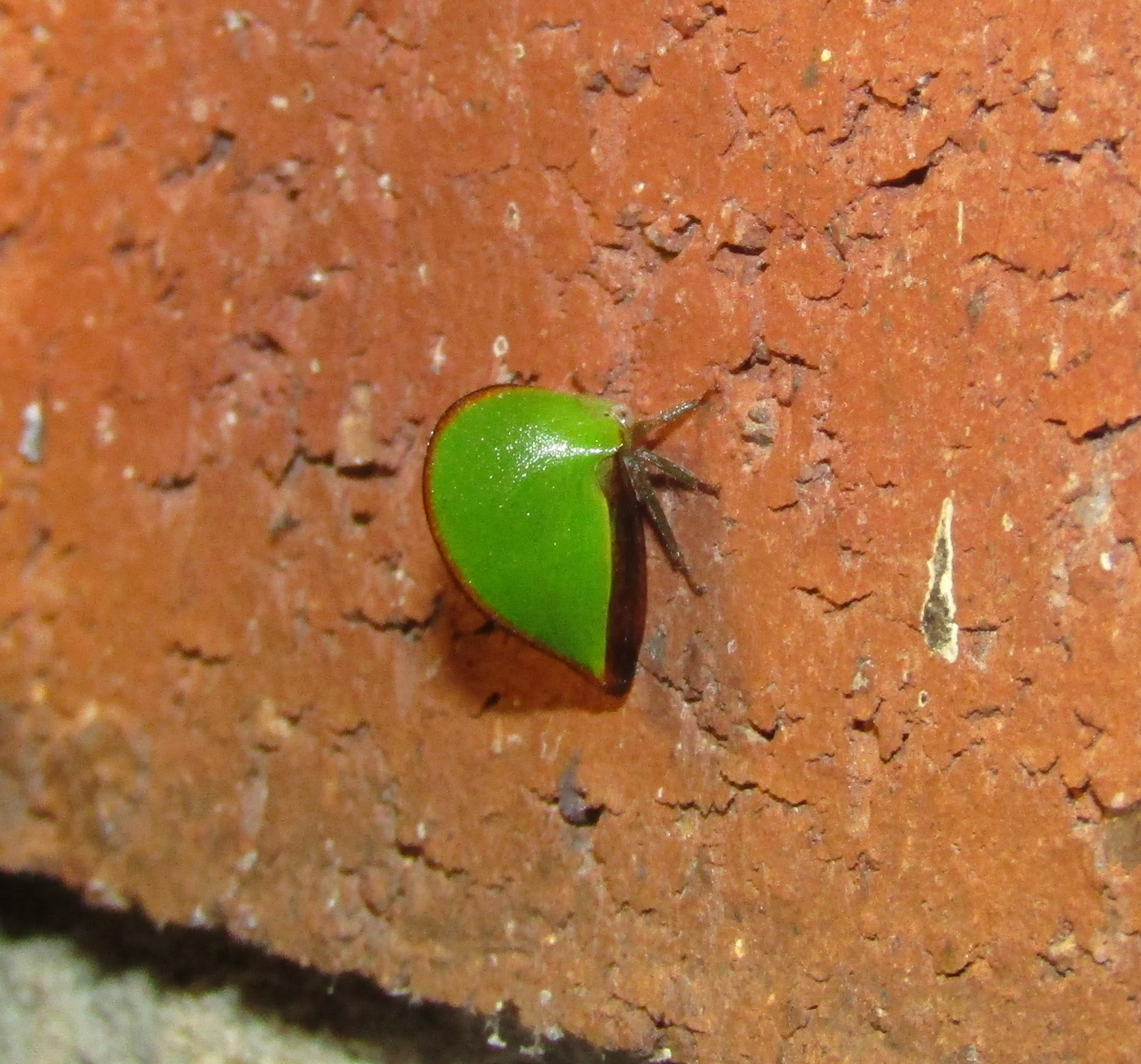
- Archasia belfragei

Scientific classification
- Kingdom: Animalia
- Phylum: Arthropoda
- Clade: Pancrustacea
- Class: Insecta
- Order: Hemiptera
- Suborder: Auchenorrhyncha
- Family: Membracidae
- Tribe: Telamonini
- Genus: Archasia; Stål, 1867

= Archasia =

Genus of true bugs

Archasia is a genus of treehoppers in the family Membracidae.

== Species ==
Three species have been described in the genus Archasia:

- Archasia auriculata
- Archasia belfragei
- Archasia pallida
