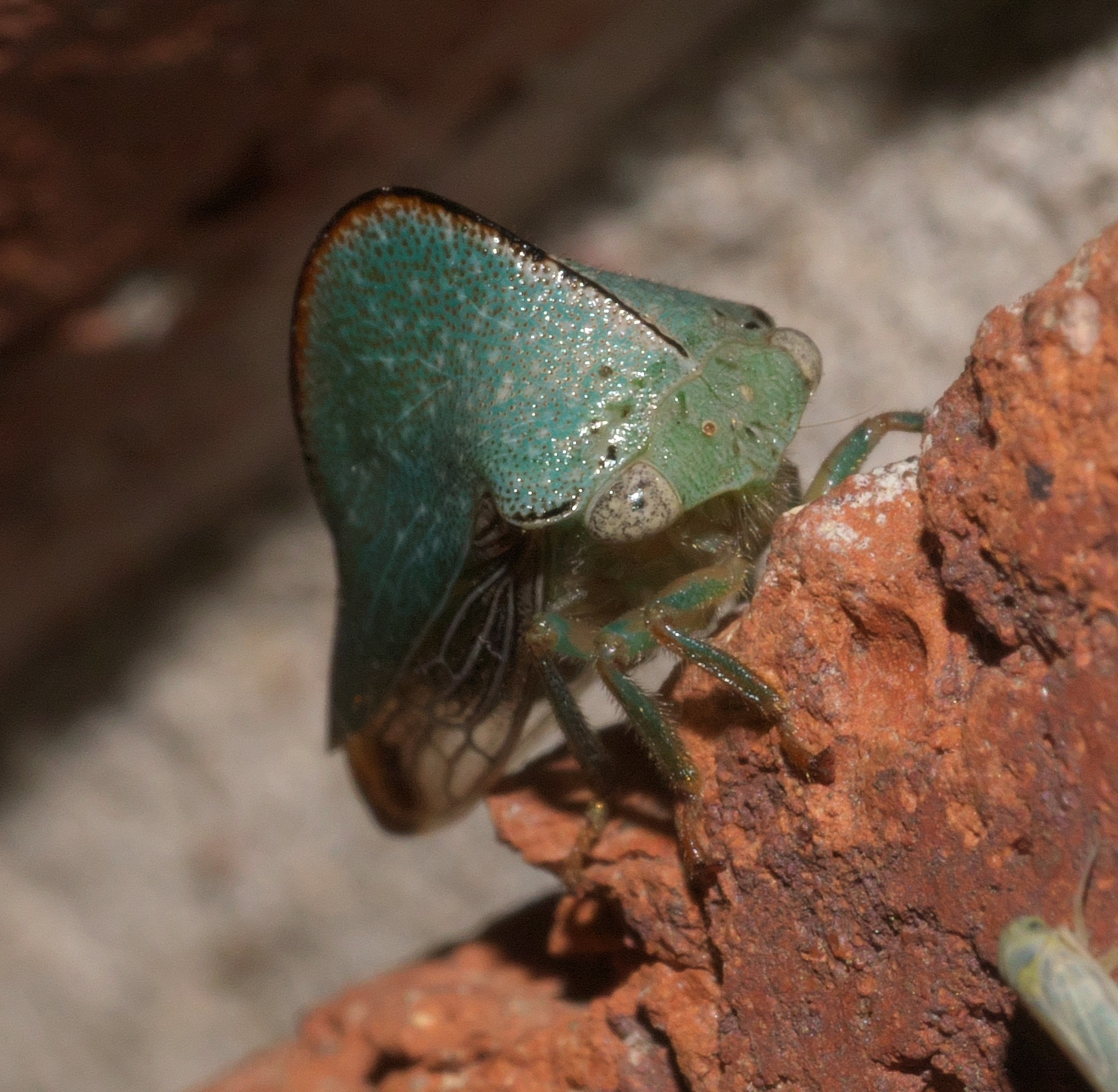
- Archasia pallida, Oklahoma

Scientific classification
- Kingdom: Animalia
- Phylum: Arthropoda
- Class: Insecta
- Order: Hemiptera
- Suborder: Auchenorrhyncha
- Family: Membracidae
- Genus: Archasia
- Species: A. pallida

Binomial name
- Archasia pallida (Fairmaire, 1846)

= Archasia pallida =

Species of insect

Archasia pallida is a species of treehopper in the family Membracidae, found in the eastern United States.
