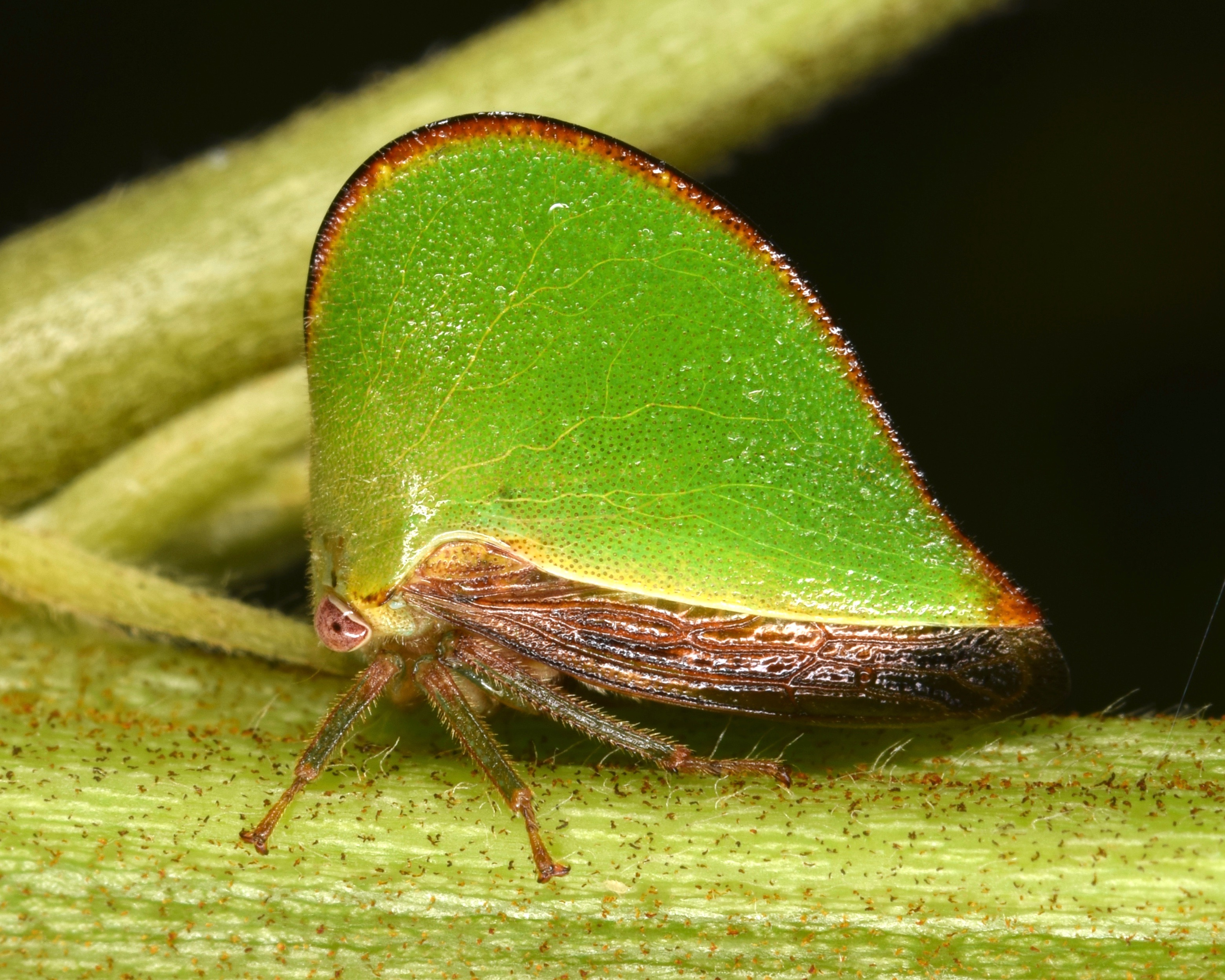

Scientific classification
- Domain: Eukaryota
- Kingdom: Animalia
- Phylum: Arthropoda
- Class: Insecta
- Order: Hemiptera
- Suborder: Auchenorrhyncha
- Family: Membracidae
- Genus: Archasia
- Species: A. belfragei

Binomial name
- Archasia belfragei Stål 1869

= Archasia belfragei =

Species of treehopper

Archasia belfragei is a species of treehopper in the family Membracidae.
