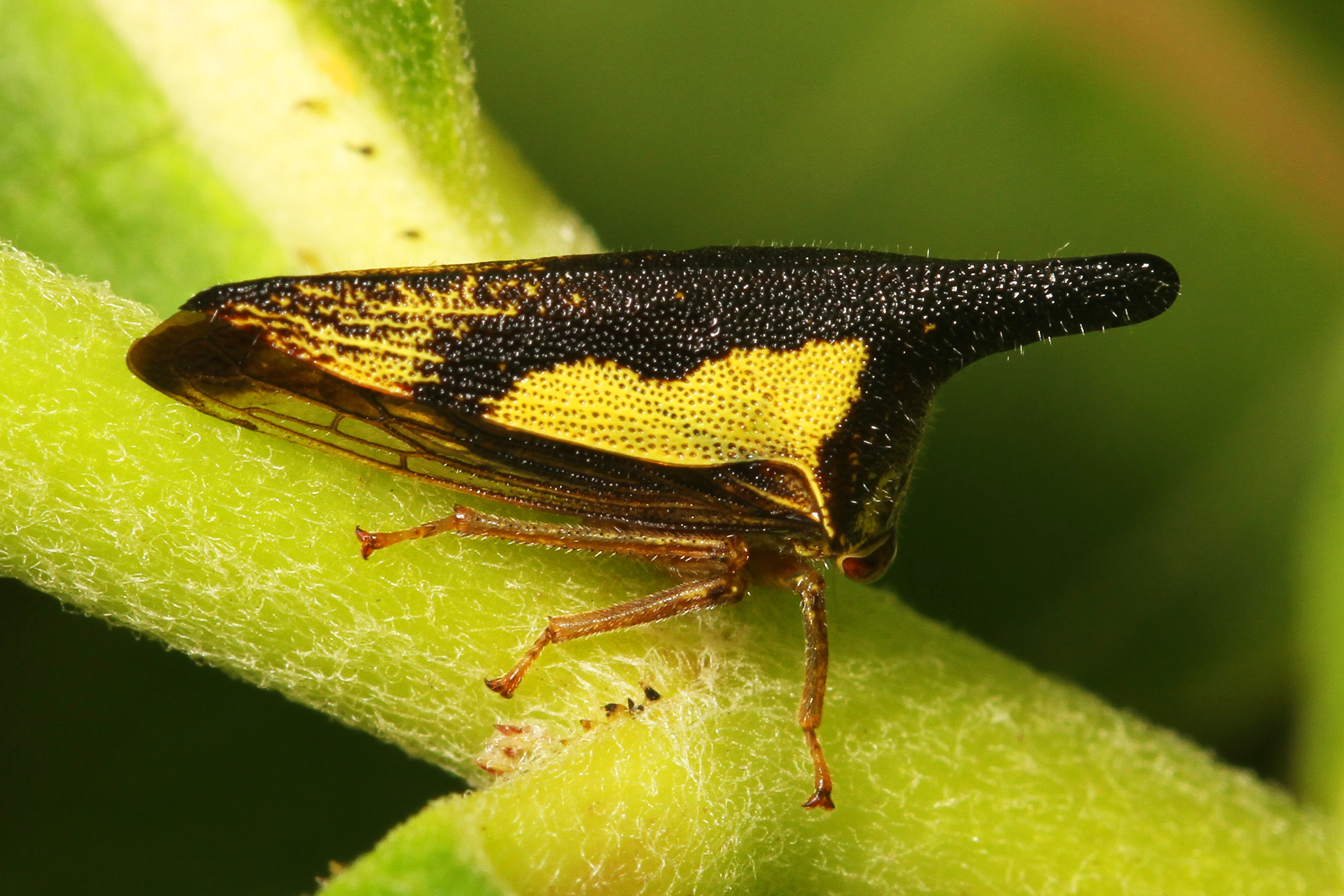

Scientific classification
- Kingdom: Animalia
- Phylum: Arthropoda
- Clade: Pancrustacea
- Class: Insecta
- Order: Hemiptera
- Suborder: Auchenorrhyncha
- Family: Membracidae
- Genus: Thelia
- Species: T. bimaculata

Binomial name
- Thelia bimaculata Fabricius

= Thelia bimaculata =

Species of true bug

Thelia bimaculata, the locust treehopper, is a species of treehopper in the family Membracidae.
