= Iron Age Greek migrations =

Greek migrations (11th to 9th century BCE)

Greek settlements in western Asia Minor, Ionian area in green.

The Iron Age Greek migrations occurred from the middle of the 11th century to the end of the 9th century BCE (the Greek Dark Ages). The movements resulted in the settlement of the Aegean islands, Cyprus, Crete, and the western coast of Asia Minor. New cities were founded which afterwards became centers of Greek civilization. Tribal groups migrated in consecutive waves known as the Aeolic, Ionian, Doric, and Achaean (Arcadian) migrations.

Compared to the Greek colonisations of the Archaic period, the Iron Age Migrations were more ad hoc affairs, rather than being a planned settlement organised by a mother city. They are also less well-documented historically. In folk histories, they are often said to have been led by legendary leaders, such as Hercules or Orestes.

== Movements within mainland Greece ==
=== Establishment of Dorians within Central Greece ===
During the 13th century BCE the Dorians, probably originating from the regions of Epirus and southern Macedonia, moved farther south into Central Greece, with a centre of power in Doris. The Dorians knew ironworking, which was a new technology during this period, and rapidly grew into a great power. The Dorians then expanded further into the regions inhabited by the Aetolians and the Locrians.

According to Herodotus, the Dorians displaced the previous inhabitants, called the Dryopes, and the Dryopes then fled to Euboea, the islands of the Cyclades, and to southern Argolis. In Euboea they set up a state in Carystus while in southern Argolis they founded the cities of Hermione, Asine, Heiones and Mases. This movement of the Dryopes was the first meaningful one in the region of Southern Greece in the shift from the Bronze Age to the Iron Age.

=== Dorian invasion of the Peloponnese ===
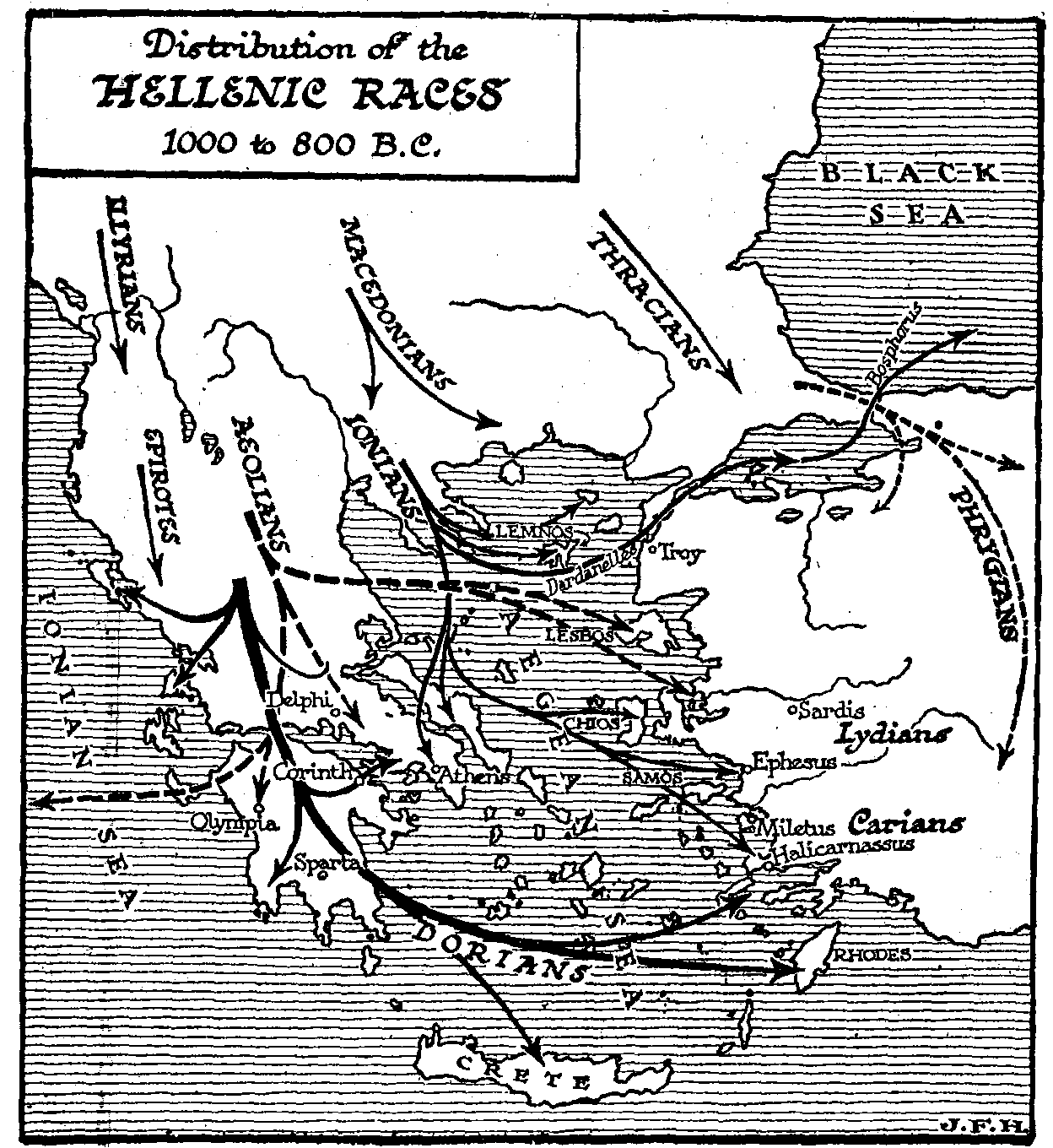
Hypothetical diagram of population movements within Greece

After consolidating their rule in the area of Stereas, the Dorians organized a campaign against the wealthy and powerful kings of Achaea in the Peloponnese. They were joined by two neighboring tribes, the Aetolians and the Boeotians, who fought with the Dorians either as allies or under their authority. In the middle of the 12th century BCE, the Dorians attacked the Peloponnese, crossing Strait of Rion with their fleet. According to the Pausanias, they crossed into the Peloponnese at the narrows of Rion-Antirion by ship, which provides the origin of the name of the city of Naupactus at this location (naus is "ship" in Greek.).

Upon their arrival in the Peloponnese, the Dorians split into four groups and each of them moved to capture one of the principal Achaean kingdoms. One group under the leadership of Cresphontes moved on Messenia and captured the kingdom of Pylos, a second group under the leadership of Aristodemus moved on Laconia and established itself in Sparta, while the third under the leadership of Temenos took Argos and Mycenae. Mycenae is supposed to have been destroyed by the Dorians around 1150 BCE. Finally, a fourth group under the leadership of Aletes, son of Hippotes moved towards the isthmus of Corinth and took the area around Corinth.

The conquest of the Peloponnese by the Dorians caused further upheavals. The Achaeans of Argolis moved northward and established themselves in the region of Achaea, displacing the Ionians, and subsequently moved east from the region of Corinth. First establishing themselves in Euboea, displacing the previous inhabitants there, the Abantes and continued on to the Aegean and the coast of Asia Minor. According to the traditional narrative, the Ionians of Attica were able to repulse the Dorian invasion, as evidenced by the continuity of their kingship of Codrus morphing into the archonship (or kingship) of his son Medon.

== Settlement of Asia Minor and the Aegean ==
=== Aeolian migration ===
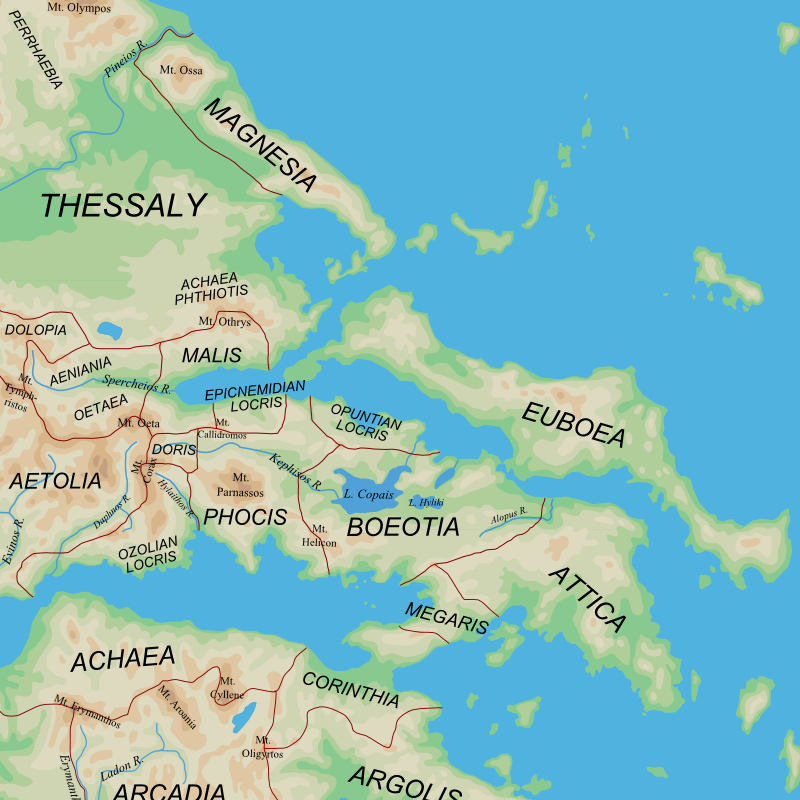
Map of ancient Greece

In the same period as Dorian invasion of the Peloponnese, other groups were migrating as well. The Thessalians, moved from Thesprotia into the area of Thessaly, displacing the earlier Aeolophone tribe who had inhabited that area. The Thessalians spurred the Boeotians to move southward into the area of Boeotia. Other peoples who had lived in Thessaly and Boeotia fled to the islands of Northeast Aegean Sea and established themselves in Lesbos, and Tenedos, and the Moschonesi (Fragrant Isles). These inhabitants were later called Aeolians from the name of a Thessalic tribe who had taken part in the migration.

The Aeolians next colonised the western coast of Asia Minor, which was named Aeolis. Herodotus relates the founding of twelve cities in that section of Asia Minor: Aegae, Aegiroessa, Gryneion, Cilla, Cyme, Larissa, Myrina, Neonteichos, Notion, Pitane, Smyrna and Temnos. In the 7th century BCE, the Aeolians also expanded into the Troad, founding the cities of Gargara Assos, Antandros, Cebre, Scepsis, Neandreia and Pitya. The Achaeans of the Peloponnese who followed the Aeolic speakers participated in the Aeolic resettlement. According to the traditional narrative, the mythological figure Orestes instigated the relocation of the Aeolians, and the royal family of the Penthilides on Mytilene claimed descent from him.

=== Ionian migration ===
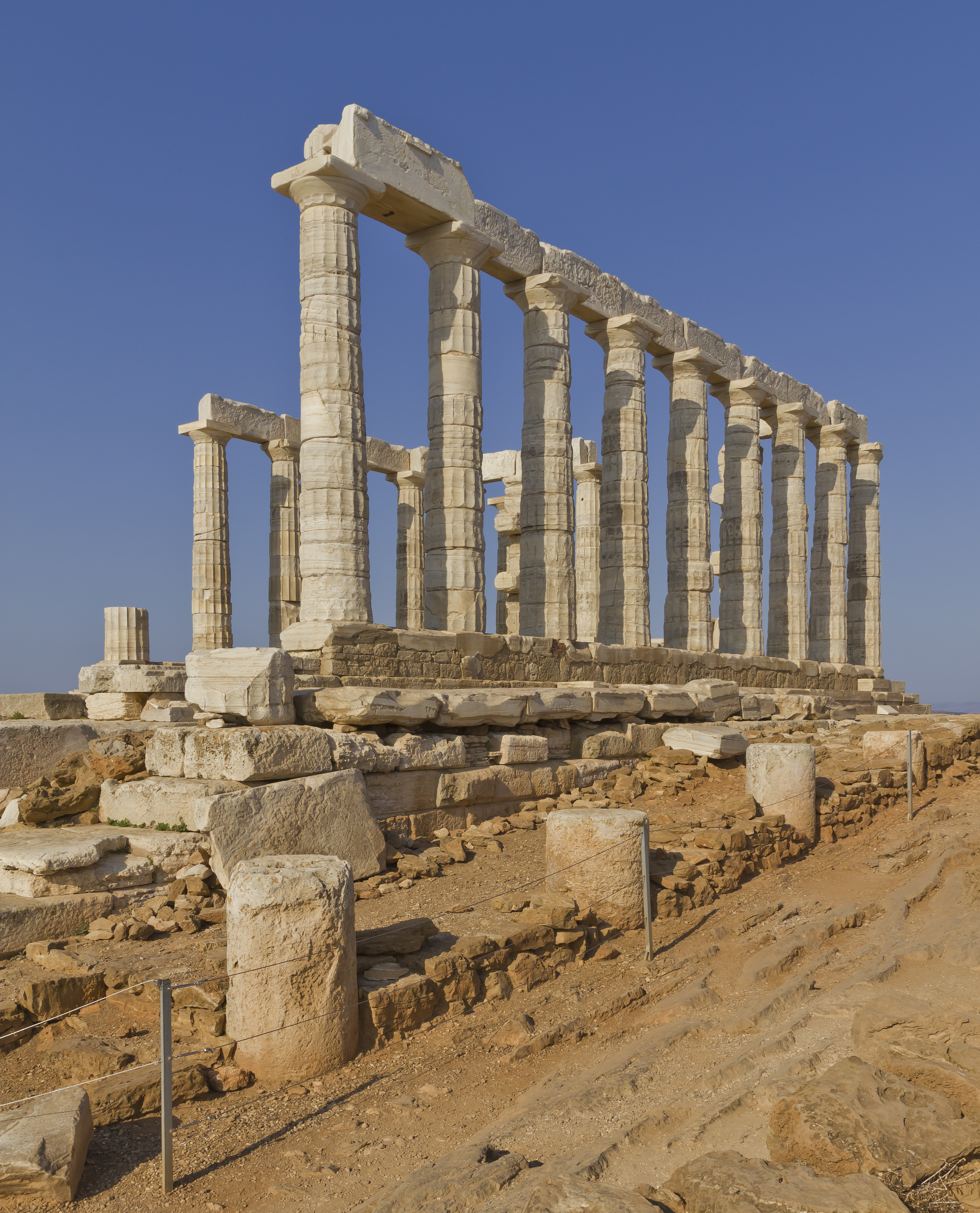
Temple of Poseidon in Attica

Before the arrival of the Dorians, the Ionians had lived in the northern Peloponnese, Megaris, and Attica. After losing their territories to the Dorians and Achaeans of Argolis, the Ionians moved farther east into Euboea, displacing the earlier inhabitants, the Abantes. In the middle of the 11th century BCE they settled the northern Cyclades and, together with the Ionians of Attica, settled the islands of Samos and Chios. Ionia, the central section of the Asia Minor coast, is named after them. The Ionians founded twelve cities which remained united in one common polity, the Ionian League. The cities of the league were Miletus, Myus, Priene, Ephesus, Colophon, Lebedus, Teos, Clazomenae, Erythrae, Phocaea and the island states Chios and Samos. A temple of Poseidon, in the area of Mycale, became their religious centre.

Other tribes such as the Achaeans of the Peloponnese, the Arcadians, the Abantai, the Minyes from Orchomenus, the Phocaeans and the Molossians established themselves in the area of Ionia. The Abantes established themselves in Chios and preceded the Ionians who came later. The settlement of the Achaeans from Pylia is related to that at Colophon, while Achaeans from Argolis were established in the area of Clazomenai. The further traditions of the Ionian cities are thought to be due to the leader of the migration being one of the descendants of Codrus, and their point of departure appears to have been Attica.

=== Dorian migration ===
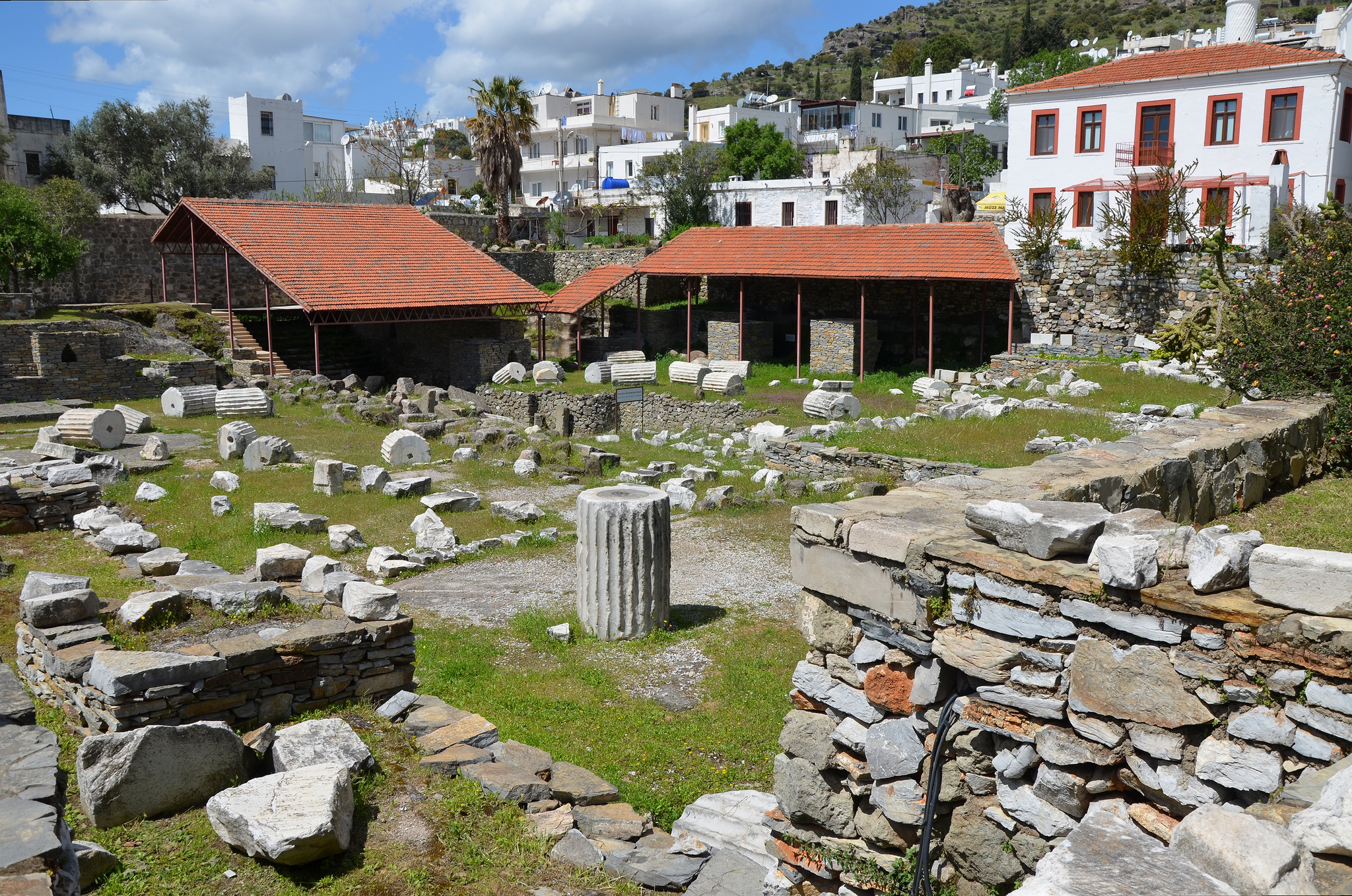
Ruins of the Mausoleum at Halicarnassus, one of the Seven Wonders of the Ancient World

The Dorians who took Argos and Corinth expanded gradually throughout the northeast Peloponnese. After failing to capture Attica, they turned toward the sea. With the Doric states of Argolis as their departure point they settled Aegina, the southern Cyclades, Cyprus, Crete, the Dodecanese and the southwestern coast of Asia Minor. Composed of various groups of Dorians from Troezen, they settled Halicarnassus; from Epidaurus, Cos, and from Argos, Rhodes, Crete, and the islands of the Cyclades. In the following years Dorians from Laconia also set up in Crete, on Thera (modern Santorini), on Milos and on Cnidus. The Dorian settlers of the regions of the Dodecanese and southwest Asia Minor joined in one form of common government, the Hexapolis, which encompassed the cities of Halicarnassus, Cnidus, Lindos, Ialysos, Camerius and Cos. The centre of the Dorians of Asia Minor was the temple of Apollo on the promontory of Triopios in Cnidus. Eventually the Halicarnassians were forbidden to participate in the ceremonies there, due to the sacrilege of one Agasicles.

== Sources ==
- Alexandropoulou, Ioanna. "Aeolian Colonization". Encyclopaedia of the Hellenic World, Asia Minor. Translated by Koutras, Nikolaos.
- Deger-Jalkotzy, Sigrid. "Ionic Colonization". Encyclopaedia of the Hellenic World, Asia Minor.
- Alexandropoulou, Ioanna. "Dorian Colonies in Asia Minor". Encyclopaedia of the Hellenic World, Asia Minor. Translated by Koutras, Nikolaos.
