= Interethnic marriage =

Marriage between individuals of different ethnic backgrounds

Interethnic marriage is a form of exogamy that involves a marriage between spouses who belong to different ethnic groups.

== History ==
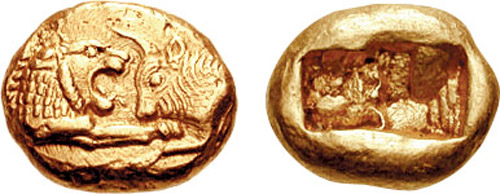
Gold croeseid of Croesus c.550 BC, depicting the Lydian lion and Greek bull - partly in recognition of interethnic parentage.

In more ancient times, some marriages between distinctly different tribes and nations were due to royalty trying to form alliances with or to influence other kingdoms or to dissuade marauders or slave traders. Two examples, Hermodike I c.800BC and Hermodike II c.600BC were Greek princesses from the house of Agamemnon who married kings from what is now Central Turkey. These unions resulted in the transfer of ground-breaking technological skills into Ancient Greece, respectively, the phonetic written script and the use of coinage (to use a token currency, where the value is guaranteed by the state). Both inventions were rapidly adopted by surrounding nations through trade and cooperation and have been of fundamental benefit to the progress of civilization.

== Effects ==
One study conducted on Africa, showed that the regions with higher levels of inter-ethnic marriages have lower levels of ethnic conflict.

== Europe ==
=== Ireland ===
To prevent the English in Ireland from integrating into Irish society, the Parliament passed the Statutes of Kilkenny in 1366. The statutes decreed that intermarriage between English settlers and Irish natives was forbidden. These acts were limited in area to the Pale and enforcement is debated.

== Asia ==
=== China ===
During the Manchu-led Qing dynasty (1644–1912), Manchu and Han bannerwomen were punished if they married Han civilians.

=== South Korea ===
In recent years, the number of inter-ethnic marriages in Korea has increased substantially. However, most of non-Korean spouses of Koreans are other Asians.

The non-Korean spouses are often from Vietnam, Japan, China, Laos, Philippines, Bangladesh, Russia and even Peru. Before 1990, most inter-ethnic marriages were between Korean women and foreign men, mainly from the United States or Japan. Marriages between Korean men and foreign women grew due to urbanization of Korea. In 2017, the ratio of Korean Men and Foreign Women to Korean Women to Foreign Men marriages were 14.9 to 6 (Korean Office of Statistics, 2018). Men in rural cities were deemed undesirable for marriage by Korean women and would then have to seek out a foreign wife. Korean women tend to move to urban cities to increase the chances of finding a Korean husband (Lim, 2010). New rules for international marriage were introduced 2014 to reduce the divorce rates, it became mandatory that the foreigner learns basic Korean and the family must make a minimum salary of $1,500 per month.

The Multicultural Family Support Act was passed in 2007. Over the years, Multicultural Family Centers have opened around Korea to assist the foreigners in adapting to their new lifestyle. These centers work to help soften the cultural shock and promote happier marriages despite the difficulties that the spouse might face. A 2013 study concluded: “Most inter-ethnic and interracial marriages take the form of a speedy arranged marriage via matchmaking agencies and religious organizations” (Chung & Yoo, 2013).

== See also ==
- Interracial marriage
- Interfaith marriage
- Interdenominational marriage
- Intercommunity marriage
- Transnational marriage
- Gay marriage
- Miscegenation
