= Cyme (Aeolis) =

Ancient Greek city

Coordinates: 38.860028°N 27.059326°E

Cyme Κύμη
- 8th century – 241 BC
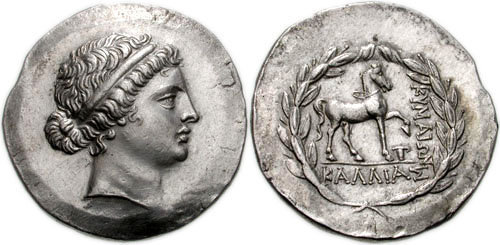
- Silver tetradrachm of Cyme, 165–140 BC

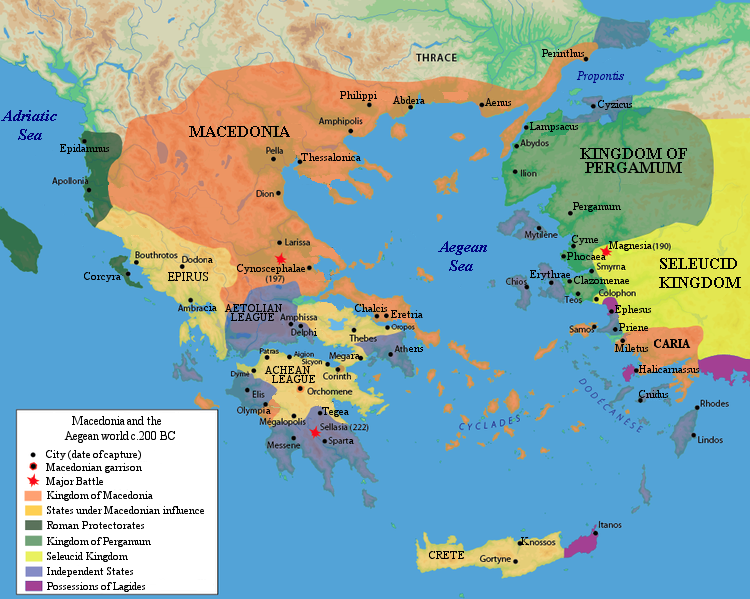
- Map of Asia Minor showing the location of Kyme in the southwest coast of the Kingdom of Pergamum.
- Capital: Kymi
- Common languages: Aeolic, Ionic Greek
- Religion: Greek Polytheism
- Government: Tyranny
- Historical era: Classical Antiquity
  - Established: 8th century
  - Colony established: c. 700 – 600 BC
  - Persian Conquest: 542 BC
  - Ionian Revolt: 499–493 BC
  - Macedonian Empire: 336–323 BC
  - Attalid dynasty: 241–133 BC
  - Roman Republic: 133 BC
  - Disestablished: 241 BC
Preceded by	Succeeded by
Greek Dark Ages	Kingdom of Pergamon

Cyme (Greek: Κύμη) or Cumae was an Aeolian city in Aeolis (Asia Minor) close to the kingdom of Lydia. It was called Phriconian, perhaps from the mountain Phricion in Aeolis, near which the Aeolians had been settled before their migration to Asia.

The Aeolians regarded Cyme as the largest and most important of their twelve cities, which were located on the coastline of Asia Minor (modern-day Turkey). As a result of their direct access to the sea, unlike most non-landlocked settlements of the ancient world, trade is believed to have prospered.

== Location ==
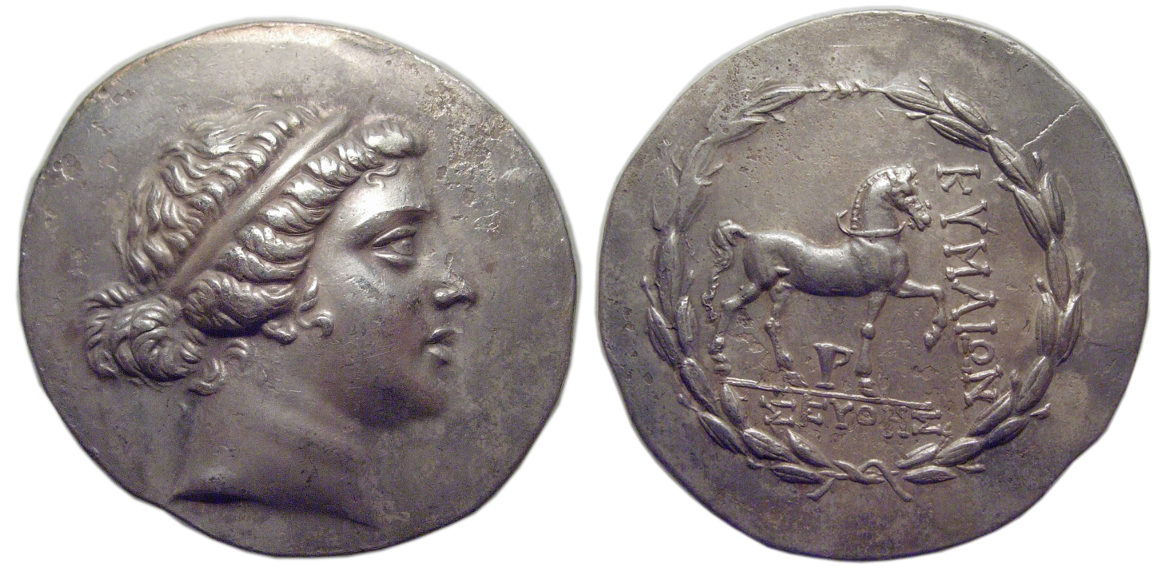
Aeolis, Kyme; Tetradrachm; Silver; circa 165-140 BC; Obverse: Head of the Amazon Kyme right, wearing taenia; Reverse: Horse walking right, skyphos (one handled cup) below, ΚΥΜΑΙΩΝ left, ΣΕΥΘΗΣ (magistrate) in exergue, all within laurel-wreath; 34.2mm, 16.409g; Reference: SNG Von Aulock 1640; Oakley obv. die 59; Sg4183 var

Both the author of the Life of Homer and Strabo the ancient geographer, locate Cyme north of the Hermus river on the Asia Minor coastline:

After crossing the Hyllus, the distance from Larissa to Cyme was 70 stadia, and from Cyme to Myrina was 40 stadia. (Strabo: 622)

Archaeological finds such as coins give reference also to a river, believed to be that of the Hyllus.

== History ==
=== Early history ===
Little is known about the foundation of the city to supplement the traditional founding legend. Kyme was the largest of the Aiolian cities. According to legend, it was founded by the Amazon Kyme. The Amazons were a mythical tribe of warlike women from Pontos (or variously from Kolchis, Thrace or Scythia), who fought against Greek heroes. Ancient coins from Cyme often depict the head of Kyme wearing a taenia with the reverse featuring a horse prancing - probably in allusion to the prosperous equine industry of the region.

Alternatively, settlers from mainland Greece (most likely Euboea) migrated across the Aegean Sea during the Late Bronze Age as waves of Dorian-speaking invaders brought an end to the once mighty Mycenaean civilization some time around 1050 BCE. During the Late Bronze Age and early Greek Dark Ages, the dialect of Cyme and the surrounding region of Aeolis, like that of neighboring island Lesbos, closely resembled the local dialect of Thessalia and Boetia in continental Greece.

The city was founded after the Trojan War by Greeks from Locris, central Greece, after they have first captured the Pelasgian citadel of Larisa near the river Hermus.

Cyme prospered and developed into a regional metropolis and founded about thirty towns and settlements in Aeolis. The Cymeans were later ridiculed as a people who had for three hundred years lived on the coast and not once exacted harbor taxes on ships making port. Hesiod's father is said to have started his journey across the Aegean from Cyme. The cities of southern Aeolis in the region surrounding Cyme occupied a good belt of land with rough mountains in the background, yet Cyme like other colonies along the coast did not trade with the native Anatolians further inland, who had occupied Asia Minor for thousands of years. Cyme consequently played no significant role in the history of western Asia Minor, prompting the historian Ephorus, 400-330 BCE, himself a native of the city, to comment repeatedly in his narrative of Greek history that while the events he wrote about were taking place, his fellow Cymeans had for centuries sat idly by and kept the peace. He may, however, have been unaware of the significance of the city's links to Phrygia and Lydia through two Greek princesses, Hermodike I and Hermodike II and their role in popularising the written Greek alphabet and coined money, respectively.

Tradition recounts that a daughter of a certain Agamemnon, king of Aeolian Cyme, married a Phrygian king called Midas. This link may have facilitated the Greeks "borrowing" their alphabet from the Phrygians because the Phrygian letter shapes are closest to the inscriptions from Aeolis.

A passage in Pollux speaks about those who invented the process of coining money mentioning Pheidon and Demodike from Cyme, wife of the Phrygian king, Midas, and daughter of King Agamemnon of Cyme.

Politically, Cyme is assumed to have started as a settler democracy following in the tradition of other established colonies in the region although Aristotle concluded that by the 7th and 6th centuries BCE the once great democracies in the Greek world (including Cyme) evolved not from democracies to oligarchies as was the natural custom but from democracies to tyrannies.

=== 5th century BC ===
By the 5th century BC, Cyme was one of the 12 established Ionian colonies in Aeolis. Herodotus (4.138) mentions that one of the esteemed voters deciding whether or not to support Militiades the Athenian in his plan to liberate the Ionian Coast from Persian rule in (year BC) was Aristagoras of Cyme. Aristagorus campaigned on the side of Histiaeus the Milesian with the tyrants Strattis of Chios, Aeaces of Samos and Laodamas of Phocaea in opposing such an initiative arguing instead that each tyrant along the Ionian Coast owed their position to Darius King of Persia and that liberating their own cities would encourage democracy over tyranny. Cyme eventually came under the control of the Persian Empire following the collapse of the Lydian Kingdom at the hands of Cyrus the Great. Herodotus is the principal source for this period in Greek history and has paid a great deal of attention to events taking place in Ionia and Aeolis.

When Pactyes, the Lydian general, sought refuge in Cyme from the Persians the citizens were between a rock and a hard place. As Herodotus records, they consulted the Greek god Apollo (supporting the claim that they were of Ionic not eastern culture), who after much confusion said through an oracle that he should be handed over. However, a native of Cyme questioned Apollo's word and went back to the oracle himself to confirm if indeed Apollo wanted the Cymians to surrender Pactyes. Not wanting to come to grief over the surrender of Pactyes, nor wanting the ill-effects of a Persian siege (a statement confirming Cyme was a fortified city capable of self-defence, as otherwise a siege would be unnecessary) they avoided dealing with the Persians by simply sending him off to Mytilene on the island of Lesbos, not far from their city. In his Histories, Herodotus makes reference to Cyme (or Phriconis) as being one of the cities in which the rebel Lydian governor Pactyes sought refuge, following his attempted rebellion against the Persian King Cyrus the Great: c.546 BC

Pactyes, when he learnt that an army was already on his tracks and near, took fright and fled to Cyme, and Mazares the Mede marched to Sardis with a detachment of Cyrus' troops. Finding Pactyes and his supporters gone, the first thing he did was to compel the Lydians to carry out Cyrus' orders — as a result of which they altered from that moment their whole way of life; he then sent a demand to Cyme that Pactyes should be surrendered, and the men of the town decided to consult the oracle at Branchidae as to whether they should obey ... The messengers returned home to report, and the citizens of Cyme were prepared in consequence to give up the wanted man.

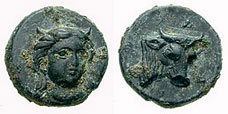
Aeolis, Larissa Phrikonis. ca 4th Century BC. Æ 11mm. Horned (?), three-quarter facing female head, turned slightly right, in necklace / LA, bull's head right.

After the Persian naval defeat at Salamis, Xerxes moored the surviving ships at Cyme. Before 480 BC, Cyme had been the principle naval base for the Royal Fleet. Later accounts of Cyme's involvement in the Ionian Revolt which triggered the Persian Wars confirm their allegiance to the Ionian Greek cause. During this time, Herodotus states that due to the size of the Persian army, Darius the Great was able to launch a devastating three-pronged attack on the Ionian cities. The third army which he sent north to take Sardis was under the command of his son-in-law Otanes who promptly captured Cyme and Clazomenae in the process. However, later accounts reveal how Sandoces, the supposed Ionian governor of Cyme helped draft a fleet of fifteen ships for Xerxes I great expedition against mainland Greece c. 480 BC. Cyme is also believed to have been the port in which the Persian survivors of the Battle of Salamis wintered and lends considerable weight to the argument that Cyme was not only well served by defensive walls, but enjoyed the benefits of a large port capable of wintering and supplying a large wartime fleet. As a result, Cyme, like most Ionian cities at the time was a maritime power and a valuable asset to the Persian Empire.

Once Aristagoras of Miletus roused the Ionians to rebel against Darius, Cyme joined the insurrection. However, the revolts at Cyme were quelled once the city was recovered by the Persians. Sandoces, the governor of Cyme at the time of Xerxes, commanded fifteen ships in the Persian military expedition against Greece (480 BC). Herodotus believes that Sandoces may have been a Greek. After the Battle of Salamis, the remnants of Xerxes's fleet wintered at Cyme. Thucydides does not provide any significant mention of place is hardly more than mentioned in the history of Thucydides.

=== Roman and Byzantine era ===
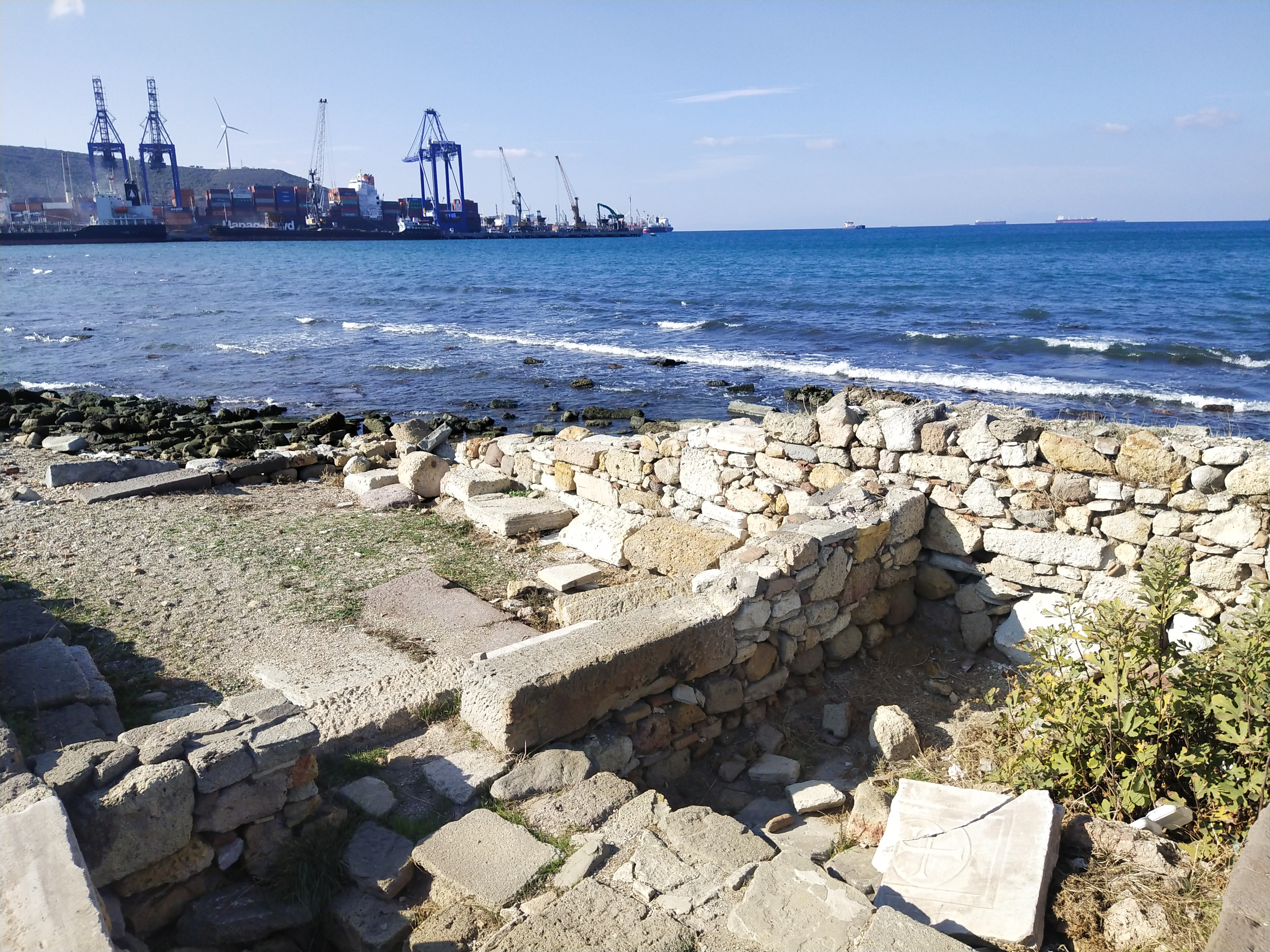
Front: Cyme Ruins and Christian Cross, Back: Aliağa Port and Wind Mill

Polybius records that Cyme obtained freedom from taxation following the defeat of Antiochus III, later being incorporated into Roman Asia province. During the reign of Tiberius, the city suffered from a great earthquake, common in the Aegean. Other Roman sources such as Pliny the Elder mention Cyme as one of the cities of Aeolia which supports Herodotus' similar claim:

The above-mentioned, then, are the twelve towns of the Ionians. The Aeolic cities are the following: Cyme, called also Phriconis, Larissa, Neonteichus, Temnos, Cilla, Notium, Aegiroessa, Pitane, Aegaeae, Myrina, and Gryneia. These are the eleven ancient cities of the Aeolians. Originally, indeed, they had twelve cities upon the mainland, like the Ionians, but the Ionians deprived them of Smyrna, one of the number. The soil of Aeolis is better than that of Ionia, but the climate is less agreeable.

It was assigned to the Roman province of Asia Prima.

The Philogelos, a Greek-language joke book, written circa 4th century CE, features a series of jokes about the people of Cyme, who are stereotyped as unintelligent, superstitious, and literal-minded.

== Ecclesiastical history ==
Nero & Diva Agrippina Jr Æ 15mm of Aeolis, Cyme. Circa 54-59 AD. QEON NERWNA KUMAIWN, young laureate head of Nero right / QEAN AGRIPPINAN, veiled head of Agrippina Jr right.

During the Eastern Roman Empire, Cyme became a bishopric, which was a suffragan of the Metropolitan of Ephesus.

=== Titular see ===
The diocese was nominally restored in 1894 as a Latin titular see.

It is vacant, having had the following (non-consecutive) incumbents, all of the lowest (episcopa) rank:

- Carlo Quaroni (1894.10.08 – 1896.01.20)
- Orazio Mazzella (1896.02.11 – 1898.03.24) (later Archbishop)
- Jeno Kránitz (1907.04.15 – 1935.07.12)
- Peter Leo Ireton (1935.08.03 – 1945.04.14)
- James Donald Scanlan (1946.04.27 – 1949.05.31) (later Archbishop)
- Urbain-Marie Person, Capuchin Friars (O.F.M. Cap.) (1955.07.03 – 1994.02.09)

== Archaeology ==
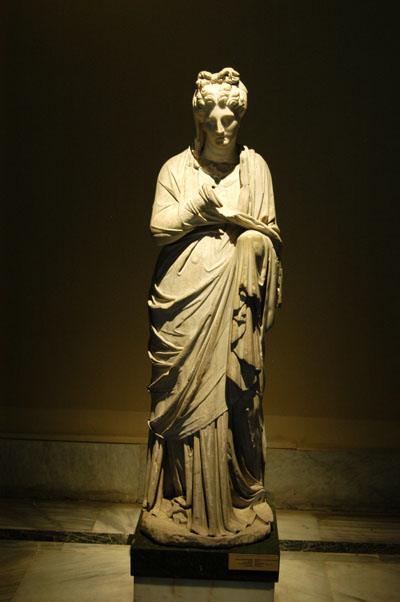
Statue of a young woman; late Hellenistic, 1st century BC, Cyme (Namurt).

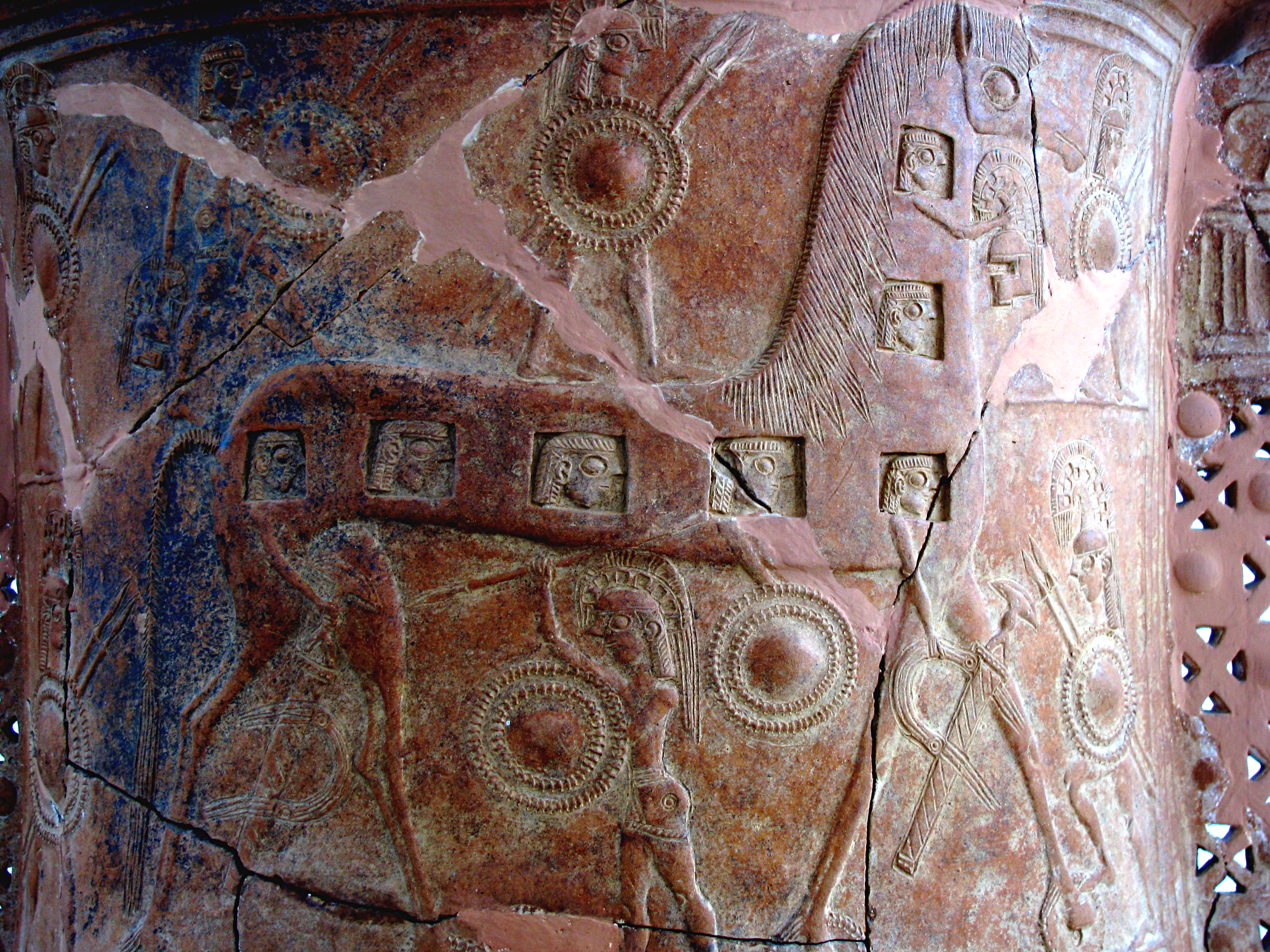
Mykonos vase 7th cent BCE. Early depiction of Trojan Horse.

Archaeologists first started taking an interest in the site in the middle of the 19th century as the wealthy landowner D. Baltazzi and later S. Reinach began excavation on the southern necropolis. In 1925, A. Salaç, working out of the Bohemian Mission, uncovered many interesting finds, including a small temple to Isis, a Roman porticus and what is believed to be a 'potter's house'. Encouraged by their successes, Turkish archaeologist E. Akurgal began his own project in 1955 which uncovered an Orientalising ceramic on the southern hill. Between 1979 and 1984, the Izmir Museum carried out similar excavations at various locations around the site, uncovering further inscriptions and structures on the southern hill.

Geophysical studies at Cyme in more recent years, have given archaeologists a much greater knowledge of the site without being as intrusive. Geomagnetic surveys of the terrain reveal additional structures beneath the soil, as yet untouched by excavations.

The northwest side of the southern hill was utilized as a residential neighborhood during the entire existence of the city. Only a limited area of the hill has been investigated. It has been verified that there were at least five successive phases of building.

1. A long and straight wall going from north to southeast represented the most ancient building phase. In the wall there are visible traces of a threshold linking two rooms. There is uncertainty as to the chronology of the wall, but what is sure is that it was built before the end of the 5th century BC.

2. Two rooms (A and B), that were part of a building dating back to the end of the 5th century BC, belong to the second phase. The building appears to be complete on the northern side, but could have also had other rooms on the southern side, where the entrance to room A opened up. The western wall of room A, was constructed with squared limestone blocks, and also acted as a terracing wall connecting the strong natural difference on the side of the hill. At the foot of this wall there was a cistern excavated in the rock that gathered water coming from the roof of the house. The cistern was filled with debris and great amounts of black and plain pottery dating back to the late Hellenistic Age.

3. Some walls that belonged to the Imperial Roman Period were constructed by means of white mortar and bricks. During this phase a service room east of room A, with a floor that was made of leveled rock, was built. In the area of the cistern, by now filled, a new room decorated by wall paintings was also built.

4. A large house occupied the area during the Late Roman Period. The rooms were constructed using reused materials, but without the use of mortar, and often enriched by polychrome mosaics. Access was gained by a ramp placed at the edge of the southwestern part of the excavation. Still, what needs to be clarified is the extent of the building, whose destruction is placed between the end of the 6th century to the beginning of the 7th century AD.

5. The final phase is represented by some superficial structures found at the northern part of the excavation. There is a long wall going from the northwest to the southeast and a ramp built with reused blocks, with the same orientation as the wall. The wall and the ramp could be proof that this area was utilized during the Byzantine Age.

=== Numismatics ===
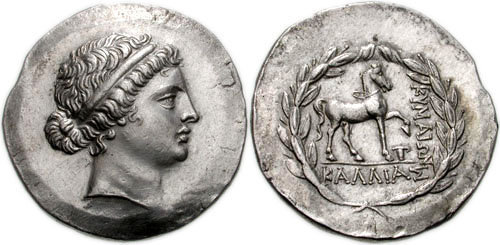
Silver tetradrachm of Cyme, 165–140 BC

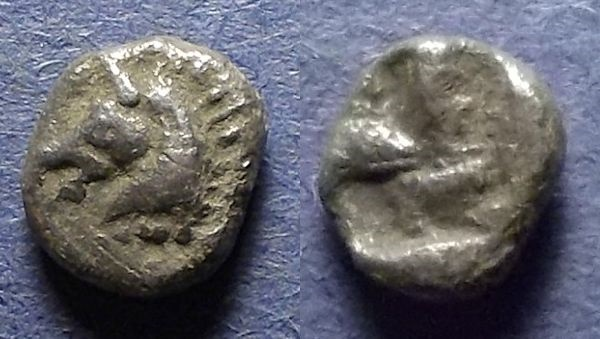
Ionia, Uncertain city (possibly Kyme, Aeolis) 600-550 BC, Hemiobol. Horse head, rough incuse

Although historians have dated the Trojan war to 1178 BC by calculating Homer's solar eclipse, it was not immortalised in the Iliad until about 750 BC. Around the same period, the Mykonos vase (or pithamphora) - which shows the wooden horse the Greeks used to infiltrate Troy - was manufactured on the island of Tinos. Referenced in both literature and art, that cunning end to the war - the Trojan Horse - had become synonymous with the name of Agamemnon. The house of Agamemnon claimed continuity at Cyme in Aeolia, associating themselves with the legends of the exploits of the Pelopids and "particularly the taking of Troy." and the symbolism of the horse was stamped in the coins from this area, presumably in reference to the power of the Agamemnon lineage. Indeed, the daughter of Agamemnon of Cyme, Damodice, is credited with inventing coined money by Julius Pollux after she married King Midas - famed for turning everything he touched into gold.

The most rational explanation of this fable seems to be, that he encouraged his subjects to convert the produce of their agriculture, and other branches of industry, into money, by commerce, whence considerable wealth flowed into his own treasury... though it is more likely, that what the Greeks called invention, was rather the introduction of the knowledge of them [coins] from countries more advanced in civilization.

It is possible that the mythical figure of Midas was based on a real king of Phrygia in the 8th century BC known as Mita. However, as with all fables, there is a problem with the dates. Coins were not invented until 610 BC by King Alyattes in Lydia whose kingdom started well after the Phrygian kingdom collapsed. His Lydian Lion was most likely the oldest coin type circulated. There were some pre-coin types, with no recognisable image, used in the Ionian city of Miletus and the island of Samos but it is noteworthy that the coins from Cyme, when first circulated around 600-550 BC, utilised the symbol of the horse - tying them to the house of Agamemnon and the glory of the Greek victory over Troy. Cyme, being geographically and politically close to Lydia, took their invention of 'nobleman's tax-tokens' to the citizens - thus making Cyme's rough incuse horse head silver fractions, Hemiobols, a candidate for the title of the Second Oldest coins - and the first used for retailing on a large-scale basis by the Ionian Greeks, which quickly spreading Market Economics through the rest of the world. For an excellent timeline graphic showing the progression from pre-coin, to lion, to horsehead imagery on the earliest coins, see Basic Electrum Types.

Damodice may still have been instrumental in striking the coinage of Cyme as both Aristotle and Pollux attribute this to her but may have been confused with whether she married a later 7th or even 6th century Midas.

The river god Hermos, horse with their forefoot raised and victorious athletes are typical symbols commonly found on period coinage minted at Cyme. Ancient coins from Cyme often depict the head of the Amazon Kyme wearing a taenia with the reverse featuring a horse prancing - probably in allusion to the prosperous equine industry of the region.

== Notable people ==
- Hermodike I attributed with transferring the Persian written script into Greece.
- Agamemnon of Cyme, associated himself with "the taking of Troy."
- Hermodike II attributed with inventing coinage for common use and transferring this throughout Greece.
- Ephorus (c. 400 – 330 BC), ancient Greek historian.
- Hesiod's father, according to the poet (Op. et D. 636), sailed from Cyme to settle at Ascra in Boeotia; which does not prove, as such compilers as Stephanus and Suidas suppose, that Hesiod was a native of Cyme.
- Antigonus of Cyme, ancient Greek prose writer.
- Teuthras of Cyme, ancient Greek musician.
- Heracleides of Cyme, ancient Greek historian.
- Rhodon of Cyme, Olympic winner at stadion race in the 213th Ancient Olympic Games, 73 AD.
- Gnostor of Cyme, Suda writes that Homer married Aresiphone who was the daughter of Gnostor of Cyme.

== See also ==
- List of ancient Greek cities

== Sources ==
- Herodotus, The Histories, trans. Aubrey de Selincourt, edit. John Marincola, ISBN 0-14-044908-6, Penguin Classics
- GigaCatholic with titular incumbent biography links

Archeology

- Missioni Archeologiche Italiane in Turchia, Modern-day archaeological survey
- Archaeological Atlas of the Aegean, 163. Aliağa / Cyme (Kyme)
- Non-Destructive Geophysical surveys: Archaeological feedback paper, M. Ciminale and D. Gallo (Department of Geology and Geophysics, University of Bari)
- Current Archaeology in Turkey, Last updated: 2007-01-30
