= History of coins =

The history of coins stretches back to the first millennium BC/BCE. Notable early examples of coins include the Lydian lion coins, Persian daric and siglos, Tong Bei, the dirham and gold dinar.

Coins are a major archaeological source of history. Coins convey information about language, administration, religion, economic conditions, and the ruler who minted those coins.

Coins were first made by the method of hammered coinage, in which a piece of metal is placed between two dies and the upper die is hit with a hammer. The Chinese produced primarily cast coinage, and this spread to South-East Asia and Japan. Although few non-Chinese cast coins were produced by governments, it was a common practice amongst counterfeiters.

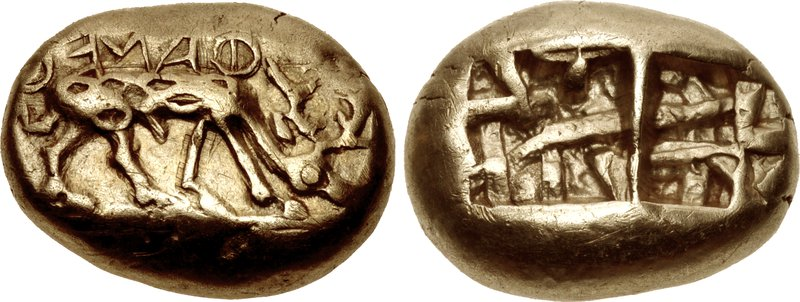
Electrum coin from Ephesus, 650-625 BC. Obverse: Stag grazing right, ΦΑΝΕΩΣ (retrograde). Reverse: Two incuse punches, each with raised intersecting lines.

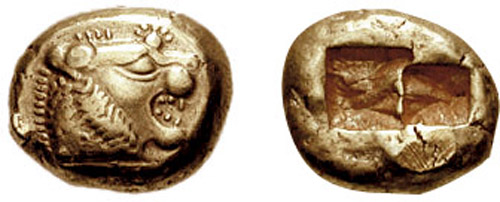
610–560 BC Lydian electrum coin denominated as 1/3

== Early coins ==
Ephesus' great temple of Artemis has provided evidence for the earliest coins yet known from the ancient world. (Note: Neiburger and Spohn, writing in Central States Archaeological Journal (October 2007) posit that fragments of hammered copper of irregular shape (which they refer to as ingots), dating from approximately 7,500 BC and found around Michigan and Wisconsin, which are often assumed to be 'scrap or damaged pieces not fit for implement manufacture', were in fact used as primitive coins. Their claim is based on the size and shape of the ingots accurately corresponding to that of the majority of other coinage used throughout history, but their evidence is speculative, and their claims have not been widely accepted by other researchers.) The first structures in the sanctuary, buried deep under the later temples, date back to the eighth century BCE, and from that time on precious objects were used in the cult or dedicated to the goddess by her worshippers.

The Lydian Lion coins were made of electrum, a naturally occurring alloy of gold and silver but of variable precious metal value. The royal lion symbol stamped on the coin, similar to a seal, was a declaration of the value of the contents. These directly preceded ancient Greek coinage, through which Rome begot all Western coinage, and through which the Seleucids, Parthians, and Sassanians begot all Islamic coinage. Indian coinage has largely been a product of Greek, Roman, and Islamic influences. Chinese coinage, though it probably developed independently, was succeeded by Western-style coinage in the late nineteenth century. Other countries in Asia, in Africa, and elsewhere have adopted the Western approach to coinage as well.

The Lydian Lion was minted by Alyettes of Lydia, 610–560 BC. However, it took some time before ancient coins were used for commerce and trade. Even the smallest-denomination electrum coins, perhaps worth about a day's subsistence, would have been too valuable for buying a loaf of bread. The Trojan Horse had become synonymous with the name of Agamemnon and the symbolism of the horse was stamped on the coins from Cyme in Aeolia, presumably in reference to the power of their lineage. Indeed, the daughter of Agamemnon of Cyme, Hermodike II, is credited with inventing coined money by Julius Pollux after she married King Midas - famed for turning everything he touched into gold.

The most rational explanation of this fable seems to be, that he encouraged his subjects to convert the produce of their agriculture, and other branches of industry, into money, by commerce, whence considerable wealth flowed into his own treasury... though it is more likely, that what the Greeks called invention, was rather the introduction of the knowledge of them [coins] from countries more advanced in civilization.

However, as with all fables, there is a problem with the dates. A real King Mita of Phrygia lived in the 8th century BC but coins were not invented until well after the Phrygian kingdom collapsed. Aylettes’ association with the Midas mythology came about because Lydian electrum came from the river Pactolus in which King Midas supposedly washed away his ability to turn all he touched into gold. Aylettes’ tax revenue may be the real ‘Midas touch’ financing his and his son's, Croesus, conquests. There were some pre-coin types, with no recognisable image, used in the Ionian city of Miletus and the island of Samos but it is noteworthy that the coins from Cyme, when first circulated around 600-550 BC, utilised the symbol of the horse - tying them to the house of Agamemnon and the glory of the Greek victory over Troy. Cyme, being geographically and politically close to Lydia, took their invention of 'nobleman's tax-token' to the citizens - thus making Cyme's rough incuse horse head silver fractions, Hemiobols, a candidate for the title of the Second Oldest coins - and the first used for retailing on a large-scale basis by the Ionian Greeks, quickly spreading Market Economics through the rest of the world. For a timeline graphic showing the progression from pre-coin, to lion, to horsehead imagery on the earliest coins, see Basic Electrum Types.

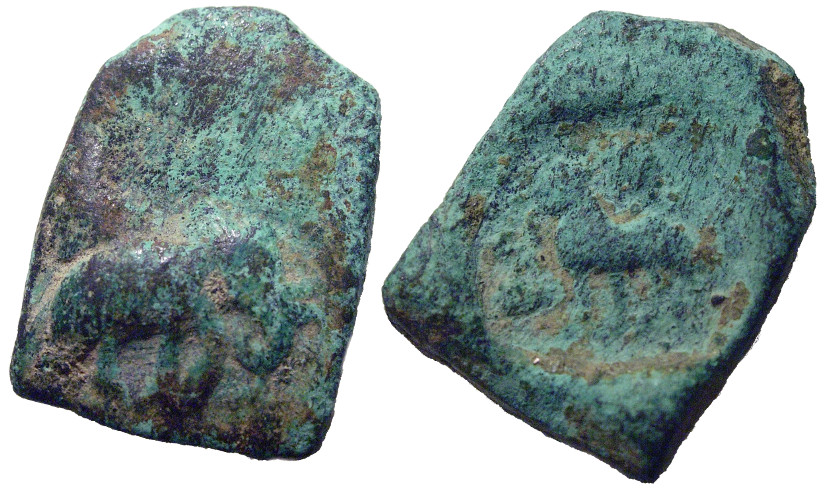
Double-die style struck coin from Ancient India, c 304-232 BCE featuring an elephant on one face and a lion on the other.

Since that time, coins have been the most universal embodiment of money. These first coins were made of electrum, a naturally occurring pale yellow mixture of gold and silver that was further alloyed with silver and copper.

However, the Persian daric was the first gold coin which, along with a similar silver coin, the siglos, (From Ancient Greek σίγλος, Hebrew שֶׁקֶל (shékel)) represented the bimetallic monetary standard of the Achaemenid Persian Empire which has continued until today. Also, the Persian coins were very well known in the Persian and Sassanids era. Most notably, in Susa and in Ctesiphon.

The Byzantine Empire minted many coins (see Byzantine currency), including very thin gold coins bearing the image of the Christian cross and various Byzantine emperors.

Coins of the 7th century Umayyad Caliphate included the silver dirham and gold dinar.

A tomb of the Chinese Shang dynasty dating back to the 11th century BCE shows what may be the first cast copper money Tong Bei. Coinage was in widespread use by the Warring States period and the Han dynasty. Also a lot of coins in China had a hole through the center so they could be tied on to a string.

Silver and gold coins are the most common and universally recognized throughout history, even today. Mints around the world still make millions of gold and silver coins, including the Canadian Silver Maple Leaf, the American Gold Eagle, and the Australian Nugget. Copper, nickel, and other metals are also common, but in lower denominations.

Celtic coinage was minted by the Celts from the late 4th century BC to the mid 1st century AD.

== Minting technologies ==
Coins were first made of scraps of metal. Ancient coins were produced through a process of hitting a hammer positioned over an anvil. The rich iconography of the obverse of the early electrum coins contrasts with the dull appearance of their reverse which usually carries only punch marks. The shape and number of these punches varied according to their denomination and weight-standard.

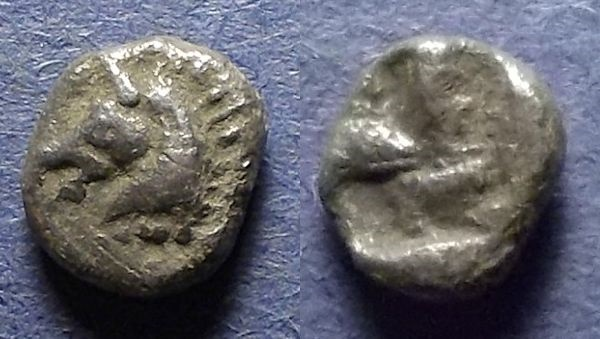
Ionia, Uncertain city (possibly Kyme, Aeolis) 600-550 BCE, Hemiobol. Horse head, rough incuse

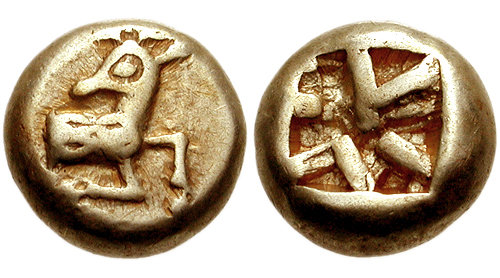
Electrum coin from Ephesus, 520-500 BCE. Obverse: Forepart of stag. Reverse: Square incuse punch

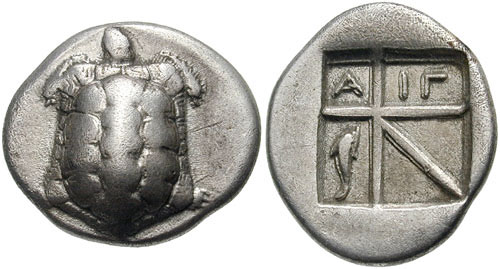
Greek drachma of Aegina. Obverse: Land turtle / Reverse: ΑΙΓ(INA) and dolphin. The oldest turtle coin dates 500 BCE

The earliest coins have a “rough incuse” where the hammer was beaten directly onto the reverse. Later technology used a “punch”, often a “square incuse”, to improve the aim of the hammer - sometimes resulting in a swastika pattern. Punches developed to bear the mark of the minter and finally to have their own design - leading to double sided coins. For a timeline graphic showing the progression from rough incuse to patterned reverses, see Basic Electrum Types. Some lion coins are completely covered by countermarks, in some cases more than ten. These marks were probably applied by moneychangers and bankers to coins that they considered of correct weight and alloy (counterfeits were not uncommon). If these coins came into their hands again, they would recognise their marks and have no need to test the coins again.

The Chinese produced primarily cast coinage, and this spread to South-East Asia and Japan. Relatively few non-Chinese cast coins were produced by governments, however it was a common practice amongst counterfeiters. Since the early 18th century and before, presses (normally referred to as mills in coin collecting circles) have been used in the west, beginning with screw presses and progressing in the 19th century towards steam driven presses. The first of these presses were developed in France and Germany, and quickly spread to Britain. Modern minting techniques use electric and hydraulic presses.

The type of mintage method (being hammered, milled or cast) does limit the materials which can be used for the coin. For example, antimony coins, (which are very rare) are nearly always cast examples, because of the brittle nature of the metal, and thus it would break if deformed, which is a key part of the milling and hammering process.

== See also ==
- Achaemenid coinage
- Ancient Chinese coinage
- Ancient Greek coinage
- Fatimid coinage
- Islamic coinage
- Coinage of India
- Parthian coinage
- Sasanian coinage
