= Boione =

Boione (Ancient Greek: Βοιωνή) was a town of ancient Aeolis. Although its name does not appear in historical texts, it is known from numismatic evidence, specifically coins from the 4th and 3rd centuries BCE that bear the inscriptions «ΒΟΙΩΝΙΤΙΚΟΝ» or «ΒΟΙΩΝΙΤΗΣ».

Most of the coins from Boione have been found in the valley of the Hermus River but the precise location of the town remains unknown. The editors of the Barrington Atlas of the Greek and Roman World suggest that Boione may have been situated between Larissa and Phocaea. This theory was initially proposed by Helmut Engelmann. However, since the key evidence for this hypothesis -- a reading of an inscription from Phocaea -- has been contested, the town's direct proximity to Phocaea remains uncertain.
