= Hermodike I =

Hermodike I has been attributed with inventing the Greek written script, i.e. the transfer of earlier technical knowledge from Phrygia into ancient Greek society through Aeolis. She is referred to by Aristotle. The same name was given as Demodike by Pollux. Academics state that Aristotle and Pollux, though ancient commentators, were not historians and so their unsubstantiated opinions may be misleading. Other historians have given the name as Hermodice or Damodice.

Hermodike I was the daughter of a dynastic Agamemnon of Cyme and became the wife of Midas, king of Phrygia, who came to the throne in 738 BCE, or alternatively Gyges of Lydia, who was referred to as King Midas (680–644 BCE) after giving the Oracle at Delphi six gold bowls (extracted from the Pactolus river). As Midas’ wife, she is likely the mother of his son Ankhyros. She is described as "a woman distinguished by beauty and wisdom". She is the ancestor of Hermodike II, who has been attributed with inventing Greek coinage.

== Linguistic history ==
Most specialists believe that the Phoenician alphabet was adopted for Greek during the early 8th century BC, perhaps in Euboea. The earliest known fragmentary Greek inscriptions date from this time, 770–750 BC, and they match Phoenician letter forms of c. 800–750 BC. The oldest substantial text known to date is the Dipylon inscription.

Hermodike I was the royal link between Phrygia and Aeolia and the conduit of knowledge that influenced the Greeks into adopting the Phrygian invention of letters.

From Aeolic Cyme a king Agamemnon married his daughter Hermodice to a Midas ruler of Phrygia… some sort of Phrygia-Aeolia-Euboea link from an early period seems almost certain.

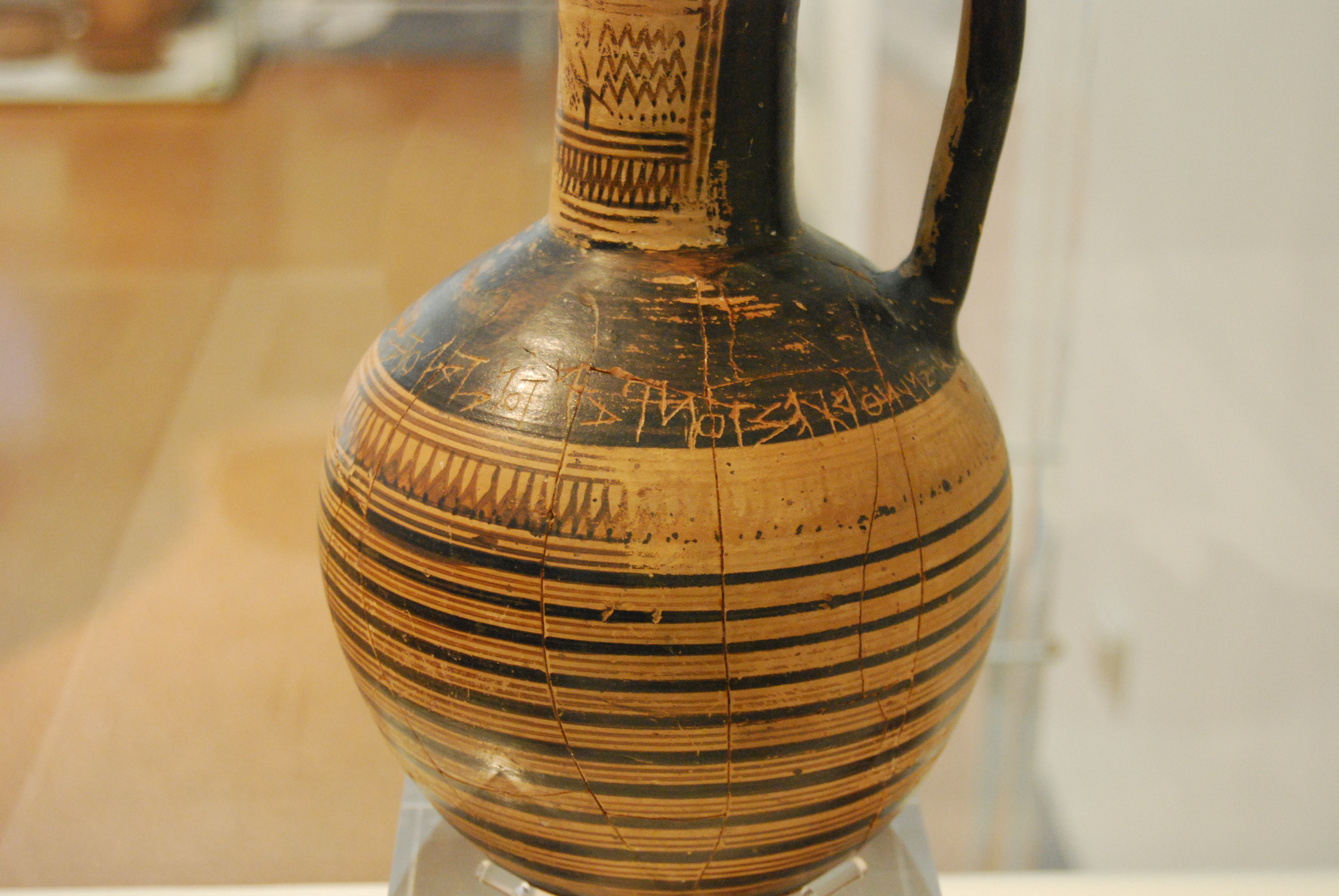
Dipylon inscription

Evidence of a link between Phrygia and Greece has been attributed by Y. Tzifopoulos to the similarities of their alphabets. The Greek alphabet is thought to be derived from the Phrygian alphabet.

Tradition recounts that a daughter of a certain Agamemnon, king of Aeolian Cyme, married a Phrygian king called Midas. This link may have facilitated the Greeks "borrowing" their alphabet from the Phrygians because the Phrygian letter shapes are closest to the inscriptions from Aeolis.

The role of Hermodike I was to communicate that technical information into Greek society as per D. Macpherson's observation,

...it is more likely, that what the Greeks called invention, was rather the introduction of the knowledge… from countries more advanced in civilization.

Hermodike I was the conduit of the phonetic alphabet into the roots of all western culture. Ancient Greek written language subsequently influenced the rest of the western world.
