= Anthippus =

Anthippus (Ancient Greek: Ἄνθιππος) was a Greek comic poet, a play of whose is cited by Athenaeus. His existence is uncertain however, and we ought perhaps to read "Anaxippus" (Ἀναξίππῳ) here.

The rhetorician Julius Pollux ascribes the creation of the Lydian mode to an Anthippus, though this attribution is considered more mythological than historical.
