= Tisna =

Town of ancient Aeolis

Coordinates: 38°46′22″N 27°03′56″E

Tisna (Ancient Greek: Τισνα), also known as Titne (Τιτνη), was a town of ancient Aeolis. It is known from numismatic evidence, specifically bronze coins of the 4th century BCE inscribed «ΤΙΣΝΑΙ», «ΤΙΣΝΑΙΟ», «ΤΙΣΝΑΙΟΣ» or «ΤΙΣΝΑΙΟΝ» that are attributed to the city. It is assumed that the city took its name from the river Tisna, whose personification appears on the coins.

Its site is located near Küçük Çanita, Güzelhisar, Asiatic Turkey.
