= Autokane =

Ancient Greek city of Aeolis

Autokane (Ancient Greek: Αὐτοκάνη) or Autokana (Αὐτοκάνα) was an ancient Greek city of Aeolis located on a mountain of the same name in Asia Minor. It is attested in the third Homeric Hymn to Apollo, where it is mentioned as the name of a mountain. There was also a city with the same name through numismatic evidence consisting of coins dated to the 4th century BCE on which the inscriptions «ΑΥΤΟΚΑΝΑ» or «ΑΥΤ» appear. The site of the city is unlocated.

== Sources ==
- Hansen, Mogens Herman; Nielsen, Thomas Heine (2004). An Inventory of Archaic and Classical Poleis. Oxford and New York: Oxford University Press. ISBN 0198140991.
