= Thymbrara =

Town in ancient Lydia

Coordinates: 38°31′02″N 28°14′54″E

Thymbrara (Ancient Greek: Θύμβραρα) was a town of ancient Lydia, near Sardis, not far from the small river Pactolus. The contingents of the Persian army furnished by the inhabitants of Asia Minor used to assemble at Thymbara. It may be the same place as Thybarna cited by Diodorus Siculus.

Its site is located near Durasıllı in Asiatic Turkey.
