= Hermodike II =

Inventor of coinage according to Aristotle

Hermodike II has been attributed with inventing coinage by Aristotle. Other historians have translated the name as Hermodice, Damodice or Demodike as translated by Julius Pollux.

Hermodike II was the daughter of a dynastic Agamemnon of Cyme and married to the third dynastic King Midas, possibly a literary reference to Alyattes of Lydia, in the 6th century BC. She was named after Hermodike I who has been attributed with inventing the Greek written script.

== Numismatic history ==
Coinage revolutionised trade and commerce, creating market economics, see History of coins.

A passage in Pollux speaks about those who invented the process of coining money mentioning Pheidon and Demodike from Cyme, wife of the Phrygian king, Midas, and daughter of King Agamemnon of Cyme.

Another example of local pride is the dispute about coinage, whether the 1st one to strike it was Pheidon of Argos, or Demodike of Kyme (who was wife of Midas the Phrygian and daughter of King Agammemnon of Kyme), or Erichthonios and Lycos of Athens, or the Lydians (as Xenophanes says) or the Naxians (as Anglosthenes thought)

— Julius Pollux, Onamastikon IX.83

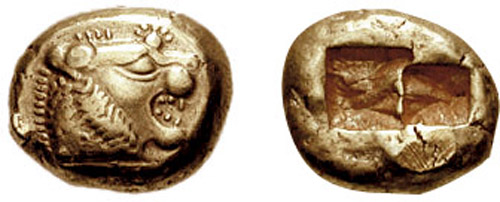
Early 6th-century BC Lydian electrum coin (one-third stater denomination)

The 8th-century BC King Midas likely Gyges of Lydia pre-dates coinage. Coins were not invented until 610 BC by King Alyattes (610–560 BC), Gyges' great grandson. The Lydian Lion coin directly preceded ancient Greek coinage, through which Rome begot all Western coinage. Yet, although the Lydian Lion was minted by Alyattes for use as a "nobleman's tax-token", "it took some time before ancient coins were used for everyday commerce and trade. Even the smallest-denomination electrum coins, perhaps worth about a day's subsistence, would have been too valuable for buying a loaf of bread." The Greeks of Cyme changed the Lydian "tax-token" into a means of transaction for the common man and woman. Stamped coins avoided weighing silver for small transactions because the symbol on the hemiobol was enough to verify its value.

Two late Greek sources record that King Midas of Phrygia married a Greek princess. Aristotle calls her Hermodike and says she "cut/struck the earliest coinage of Kyme." Pollux names her Demodike, the daughter of King Agamemnon of Kyme, and he notes that she was but one among several others who were alleged to have been the first to strike coins. Both sources cite Kyme in Aeolis, on the west coast of Asia minor, as the princess's home and Pollux specifically identifies her father as being king there. Given the late date (albeit derived from earlier sources) of the accounts, the fact coinage is mentioned, and that there were presumably 7th century, as well as 6th-century Phrygian kings named Midas, it remains uncertain that the Midas-Mita of the 8th century BC, and not a later one.

However, academics state that Aristotle and Pollux, though ancient commentators, were not historians and so their unsubstantiated opinions may be misleading. Given the technological and chronological link to minting, Hermodike II may have been married to Alyattes of Lydia, who had more than one wife, and who amassed great wealth, like Midas, by sourcing the electrum for his coins from Midas’ fabled river Pactolus.

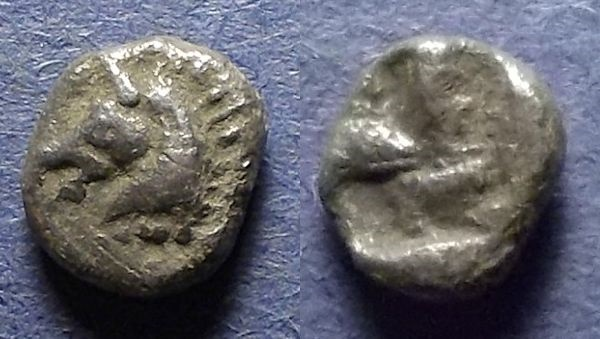
Ionia, Uncertain city (possibly Kyme, Aeolis) 600–550 BCE, Hemiobol. Horse head, rough incuse

Hermodike II is attributed to the global spread of coinage. The coins from Cyme, when first circulated around 600–550 BCE, utilised the symbol of the horse. The symbol of the Trojan Horse tied the dynasty of Agamemnon with the glory of the original Agamemnon through the Greek victory over Troy.

In contrast to works of art and inscriptions, Greek and Roman coins are wholly official in the information they impart, for the simple reason (not sufficiently often realized) that they were almost always produced under state prerogative. They therefore embodied the authority of the state, clear and unmistakable.

it is more likely, that what the Greeks called invention, was rather the introduction of the knowledge of them [coins] from countries more advanced in civilization.

Alyattes created coinage - to use a token currency, where the value is guaranteed by the state and not by the value of the metal used in the coins - and the role of Hermodike II was to communicate that technology and philosophy into Greek society as per D. Macpherson's observation,

From Aeolic Cyme a king Agamemnon married his daughter Hermodice to a Midas ruler of Phrygia. We do not know whether this was the eighth-century Midas or (if it was true that Hermodice struck the first coinage of Cyme) a later Midas ruling under Lydian or Persian authority; but some sort of Phrygia-Aeolia-Euboea link from an early period seems almost certain.

Hermodike II was the royal link between Lydia and Aeolia – the conduit of knowledge and the person who influenced the Greeks into adopting the invention of coins. Ancient Greek market economics subsequently influenced the rest of the western world.
