= Neonteichos =

Ancient Greek town in modern Turkey

Coordinates: 38°39′32″N 27°05′24″E

Neonteichos (Ancient Greek: Νέον τεῖχος, lit. 'new wall'), was an Aeolian town not far from the coast of Mysia, situated between the Hermus and the town of Larissa, from which its distance was only 30 stadia. It is said to have been founded by the Aeolians, as a temporary fort on their first arrival in Asia Minor. According to Strabo, the place was more ancient even than Cyme; but according to a statement in the Vita Homeri it was built eight years later than Cyme, as a protection against the Pelasgians of Larissa.

Its site is tentatively located near Yanıkköy, Asiatic Turkey.
