= Heracleides of Cyme =

Heracleides (or Heraclides) of Cyme (Ancient Greek: Ἡρακλείδης ὁ Κυμαῖος; fl. 350 B.C.) is a little-attested Greek historian who wrote a multivolume Persica, or history of Persia, not extant. Fragments from the Persica are preserved primarily by Athenaeus and it describes the customs of the Persian court. Heracleides was himself a subject of Persia under the Achaemenid Empire.
