= Croesus and Fate =

1886 short story by Tolstoy

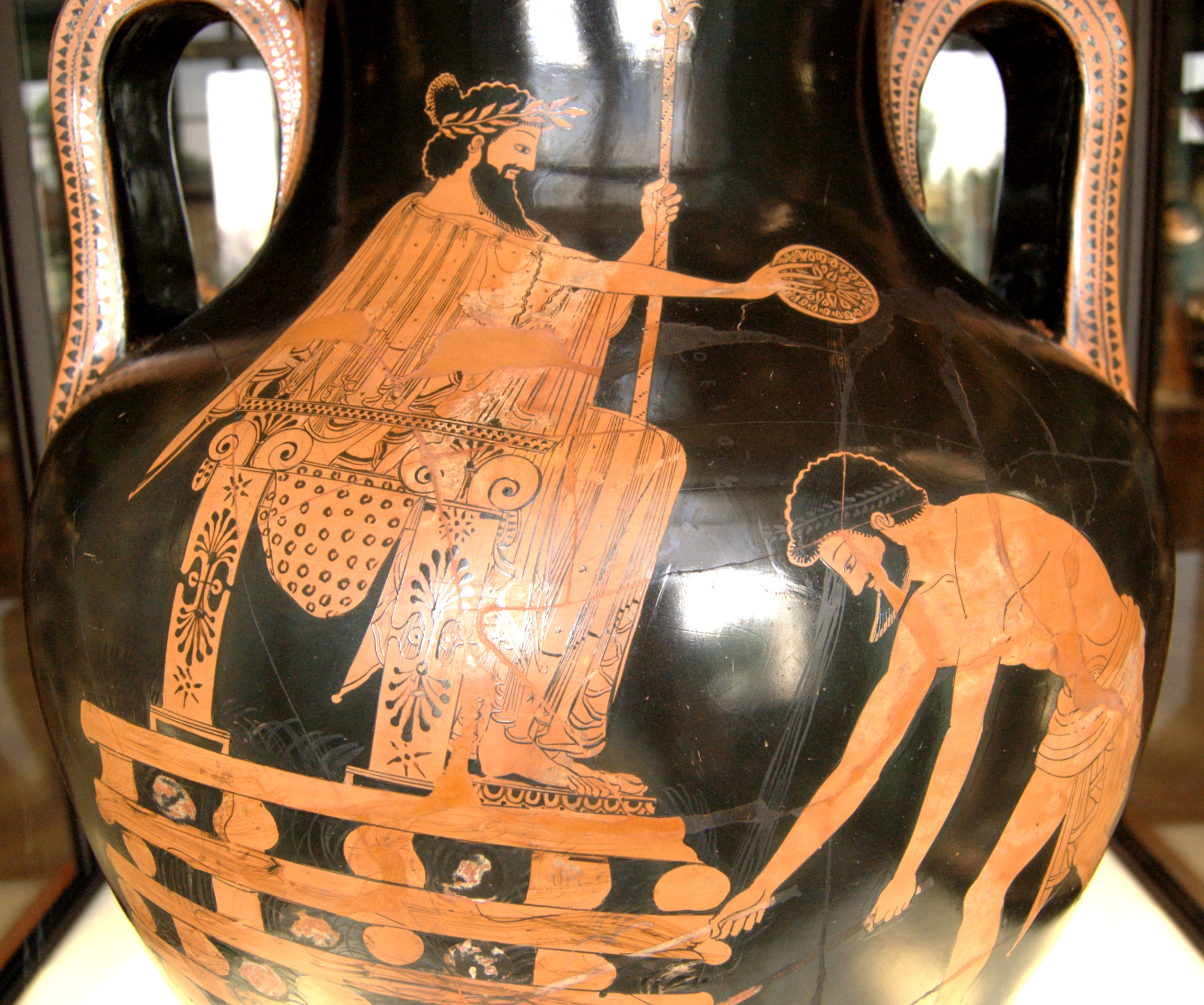
Croesus on the pyre, Attic red-figure amphora, 500–490 BC, Louvre (G 197)

"Croesus and Fate" (AKA: "Croesus and Solon") is a short story by Leo Tolstoy that is a retelling of a Greek legend, classically told by Herodotus, and Plutarch, about the king Croesus. It was first published in 1886 by Tolstoy's publishing company The Intermediary. Tolstoy's version is shorter than that by Herodotus, and Tolstoy's characterization of Croesus was designed to parallel the title character in his 1886 novella The Death of Ivan Ilych.

== Synopsis ==
Croesus is a rich king in ancient Lydia who is quite enamored with his own wealth. When the wise man Solon comes to visit his kingdom, Croesus asks Solon if he had ever seen greater opulence than his own. Solon replies that birds like peacocks are incomparable in their beauty. Croesus disagrees, and he tries to impress Solon with a list of vanquished foes and claimed territories. Solon still disagrees, telling Croesus that the happiest man he had ever met was a peasant in Athens. He explains that the peasant worked hard, raised a family, and was content with what he had. Croesus takes this as an insult and Solon leaves.

Soon after Solon's departure, tragedy befalls Croesus. His oldest son is killed in a hunting accident, and then Emperor Cyrus invades. Cyrus' army is triumphant, and Croesus' kingdom is ravaged and Croesus himself is captured and ordered to be executed. As Croesus is about to be burned on a pyre, he cries out Solon's name. Cyrus stops the pyre to hear what Croesus has to say. Croesus relates Solon's story to Cyrus, and Cyrus is moved by the notion that Fate can bring misery to a rich man and happiness to a poor man. Croesus is freed and the emperor and the king become good friends.

== Bibliography ==
- Black's Readers Service Company. The Works of Tolstoi. Roslyn, New York. 1928.
- Medzhibovskaya, Inessa. Tolstoy and the Religious Culture of His Time: A Biography of a Long Conversion, 1845-1887. Lexington Books. Lanham, MD, 2008.
- Taleb, Nassim N. Fooled by Randomness: The Hidden Role of Chance in Life and in the Markets. New York: Random House and Penguin. 2001. ISBN 0-8129-7521-9
- Herodotus. The Histories Book 1: Clio. 440 BC.

== See also ==
- Leo Tolstoy bibliography
