= Cilla (city) =

Town of ancient Aeolis and ancient Mysia

Cilla or Killa (Ancient Greek: Κίλλα) was a town of ancient Aeolis and later of ancient Mysia, mentioned by Homer in the Iliad, alongside the cities Chryse and Tenedus.

The city is mentioned by other Greek writers. Herodotus counted Cilla as one of the eleven old Aeolian cities of Asia.

Strabo places Cilia in the Adramyttene: He says, "...near to Thebe is now a place named Cilia, where the temple of Apollo Cillaeus is; there flows by it the river Cillos which comes from Ida; both Chrysa and Cilla are near Antandrus; also the hill Cillaeum in Lesbos derived its name from this Cilla; and there is a mountain Cillaeum between Gargara and Antandrus; Daes of Colonae says that the temple of Apollo Cillaeus was first built at Colonae by the Aeolians, who came from Hellas; and they say that a temple of Apollo Cillaeus was also built at Chrysa, but it is uncertain whether this Apollo was the same as Smintheus, or another."

According to fragmentary inscriptions from the Acropolis, Cilla was a member of the Delian League.

The river mentioned by Strabo is identified with the modern Zeytinli Dere, but the site of the town itself has not been discovered.
