= Chryse (Aeolis) =

Coordinates: 39°35′06″N 26°55′41″E

Chryse (Greek: Χρύση) was a town of ancient Aeolis in western Asia Minor, mentioned by Pliny as no longer existing in his time.

The site of Chryse is tentatively located at Mağara Tepe, near Akçay.
