= Tong Bei =

Ancient Chinese money

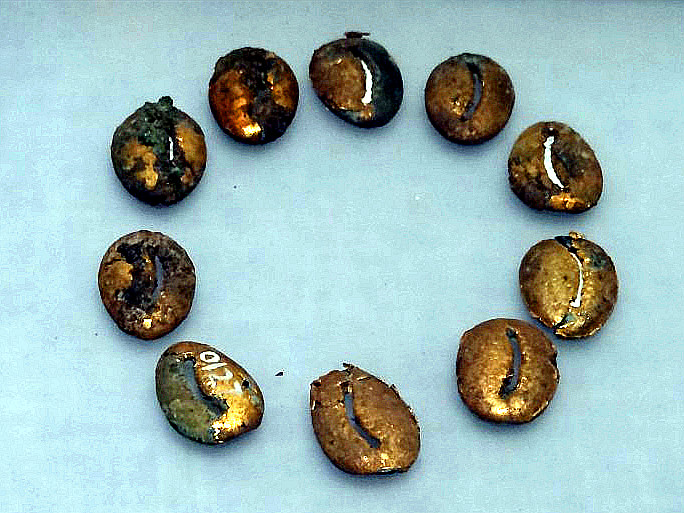
Bronze wampums covered with "gold lead".

Tong Bei (simplified Chinese: 铜贝; traditional Chinese: 銅貝; pinyin: tóng bèi) literally translated as "bronze cowry" or "bronze shell", is an ancient coin found in China.

This coin itself is a replica of more ancient cowry money, made for the purpose of replacing it.

A cowry shell or bronze cowry was denominated in bèi (貝) and string of cowry shells was called a péng (朋) however it is not known how many bèi were in a péng.
