= Aegiroessa =

City of ancient Aeolis

Aegiroessa or Aigiroessa (Greek: Αἰγιρόεσσα) was a city of ancient Aeolis, which Herodotus enumerates among the 11 cities of Aeolis; but nothing more is known of it.

The site of Aegiroessa is unlocated.
