= Pactolus =

River in Turkey

Coordinates: 38°31′24″N 28°02′34″E

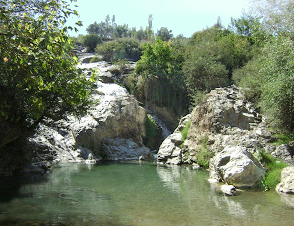
Pactolus river

The Pactolus (Ancient Greek: Πακτωλός, romanized: Pakṭōlos), also called Chrysorrhoas (Χρυσορρόας), the modern Sart Çayı or "'Sardis stream'", is a river near the Aegean coast of Turkey. The river rises from Mount Tmolus, flows through the ruins of the ancient city of Sardis, and empties into the Gediz River, the ancient Hermus.

The Pactolus once contained electrum, which was the basis of the economy of the ancient state of Lydia, where the naturally occurring alloy of gold and silver was used to mint the first coins under Alyattes of Lydia.

== Name ==
Pseudo-Plutarch in De fluviis (second century CE) writes that the river was initially called Chrysorrhoas (Χρυσορρόας 'streaming with gold') because according to legend, Chrysorrhoas (the son of Apollo) threw himself into its waters.

Later Greek mythology explains the river's re-naming as Pactolus, from Pactolus, the son of Leucothea, who during a festival of Aphrodite failed to recognize his own sister, Demodice of Lydia, and ravished her. Upon realizing what he had done, overwhelmed with grief, he in his turn threw himself into the river. Because of this, the name of the river was changed from Chrysorrhoas to Pactolus.

The adjective "Pactolian" refers to the river.

== Legend ==
As a river-god, Pactolus was said to be the brother of another river Hydaspes, and thus, offspring of the Titans Oceanus and Tethys. He was the father of Euryanassa, one of the possible mothers of Tantalus's children.

The only myth where Pactolus was an active participant is recounted in Nonnus's Dionysiaca detailing the young god, Dionysus, in his Indian campaign. According to legend, King Midas divested himself of the golden touch by washing himself in the river. The historian Herodotus claimed that the gold contained in the sediments carried by the river was the source of the wealth of King Croesus, son of Alyattes.

In Sophocles's Philoctetes, the chorus recognizes Gaia as ruler of the "golden stream Pactolus".

The river is mentioned in Sextus Propertius's Elegy 1.6.

"at tu seu mollis qua tendit Ionia, seu qua
Lydia Pactoli tingit arata liquor..."

("But wherever either soft Ionia extends, or wherever the water of the Pactulus stains the Lydian fields...")
