= Larissa Phrikonis =

Bronze Age city in the Aegean Region of Turkey

Coordinates: 38°40′03″N 27°01′53″E

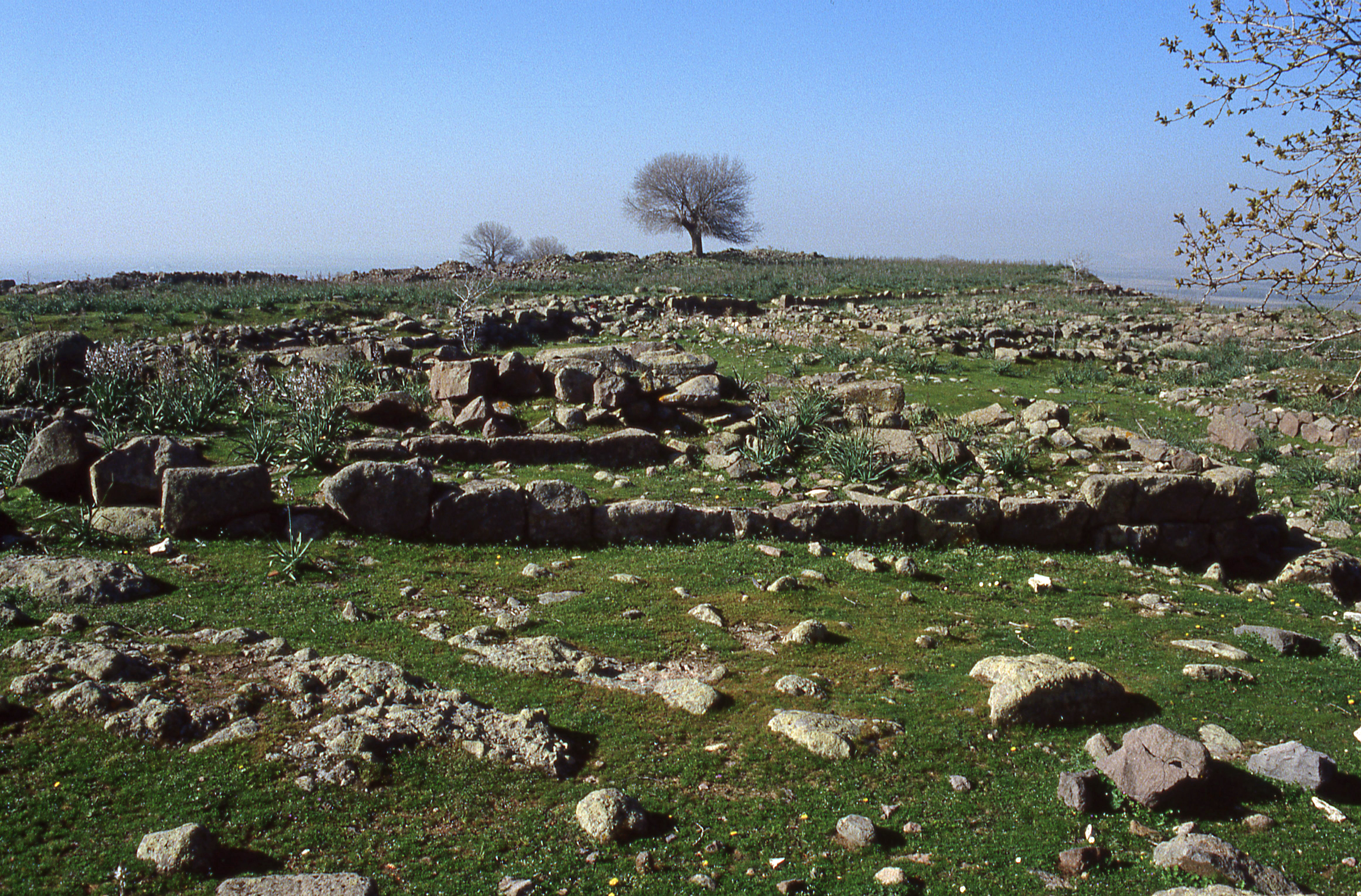
- The acropolis of Larisa on the Hermos in 1991

- Location within Turkey
- Location: Turkey

History
- Built: EBA (3rd millennium BC)

Larissa (Ancient Greek: Λάρισσα) or Larisa (Λάρισα) Phrikonis, also known as Larisa on the Hermos, was a city in the region of Aeolis in western Asia Minor (modern Turkey).

== Location ==
It has been identified with an archaeological site excavated in the early 20th century on a hilltop next to the village of Buruncuk, in the vicinity of Menemen, ca. 30 km north of İzmir, although the identification has sometimes been challenged. The hill overlooks the Gediz River, known in antiquity as the Hermos, which here passes through a fertile plain formed by alluvial soil carried from the Anatolian inland.

== History ==
=== Early Bronze Age ===
The first nucleus of Larissa formed during the third millennium BC.

=== Classical Age ===
The city survived all through the Persian and Hellenistic periods, though it was largely destroyed during the Peloponnesian War in 405 BC. Larissa was rebuilt after the war but was annihilated by the Galatians (Celts) in 279 BC. It is known as one of the twelve Aeolian cities. Strabo considered that this Larissa was the one mentioned in Homer's Iliad. Xenophon writes that Cyrus the Great established a colony of Egyptian soldiers there. Xenophon also relates that it was besieged in vain by Thimbrom. In Strabo's time it was deserted, although it is mentioned by other ancient geographers such as Pliny the Elder, Ptolemy, and Stephanus of Byzantium.

The first excavations in Larissa were initiated in 1902 by Swedish and German archeologists. The finds were taken to Stockholm and to Istanbul archeological museums.
