= Julius Pollux =

2nd century Greek grammarian and sophist

Julius Pollux (Greek: Ἰούλιος Πολυδεύκης, Ioulios Polydeukes; fl. 2nd century AD) was a Greek scholar and rhetorician from Naucratis, Roman Egypt. Emperor Commodus appointed him a professor-chair of rhetoric in Athens at the Academy — on account of his melodious voice, according to Philostratus' Lives of the Sophists.

== Works ==
Pollux was the author of the Onomasticon (Ὀνομαστικόν), a Greek thesaurus or dictionary of Attic synonyms and phrases, in ten books, each prefaced with a dedication to the emperor Commodus. The work forms part of the Atticist movement of the Second Sophistic, and was intended to provide a full catalogue of the Greek vocabulary derived from classical texts that an accomplished orator could deploy. Within this movement, Pollux shows himself "a liberal and inclusive Atticist," willing to admit vocabulary from classical authors in non-Attic dialects (like Herodotus), from post-classical works (such as New Comedy and Hellenistic historiography), and from contemporary spoken Greek. The entries in the work are arranged not alphabetically but according to subject-matter. Pollux claims that the exact order of subjects is random, but contemporary scholarship has discerned organisational patterns based on "the paradigmatic relationships at the heart of Romano-Greek society." For example, Book 5 is divided into two halves, the first of which deals with words relating to hunting and the second half of which Pollux calls "eclectic" (e.g. the entries in 5.148-5.152 are: proischesthai "to hold forth", grammata en stelais "writing on steles", diakores "satiated", anamphibolon "unambiguous"), but, within this eclecticism, Zadorojnyi nevertheless notes a tendency to focus on binary oppositions like love and hate, praise and denunciation.

It supplies other valuable information on many points of classical antiquity — objects in daily life, the theater, politics – and quotes numerous fragments of lost works. Thus, Julius Pollux became invaluable for William Smith's Dictionary of Greek and Roman Antiquities, 1842, etc.

Nothing of his rhetorical works has survived, except some of their titles (in the Suda).

== Contemporary reception ==
Pollux was probably the person satirized by Lucian as a worthless and ignorant person who gains a reputation as an orator by sheer effrontery, and pilloried in his Lexiphanes, a satire upon the affectation of obscure and obsolete words.

== Editions ==
- 1502, ed. by Aldus Manutius in Venice. Re-edited at 1520 by Lucantonio Giunta and at 1536 by Simon Grynaeus in Basel.
- 1900–1967, ed. E. Bethe, Leipzig (Teubner). Volume 1, Volume 2, Volume 3.

== Translations ==
A Latin translation made by Rudolf Gwalther was published in Basel at 1541 and made Julius Pollux more available to Renaissance antiquaries and scholars, and anatomists, who adopted obscure Greek words for parts of the body.

== Bibliography ==
- Encyclopædia Britannica, 1999
- Avotins, I. (1975). "The Holders of the Chairs of Rhetoric at Athens". Harvard Studies in Classical Philology. 79: 313–324. doi:10.2307/311142. ISSN 0073-0688. JSTOR 311142.
- Cinzia Bearzot, Franca Landucci, Giuseppe Zecchini (ed.), L'Onomasticon di Giulio Polluce. Tra lessicografia e antiquaria. Milano: Vita e Pensiero, 2007. Pp. viii, 173 (Contributi di storia antica, 5)
- König, Jason; Whitmarsh, Tim (2016). König, Jason; Whitmarsh, Tim (eds.). "Re-reading Pollux: Encyclopaedic Structure and Athletic Culture in "Onomasticon" Book 3". The Classical Quarterly. 66 (1): 298–315. doi:10.1017/S0009838816000331. hdl:10023/6992. ISSN 0009-8388. JSTOR 43905750.
- König, Jason (2007). "Ordering knowledge". In Jason König; Tim Whitmarsh (eds.). Ordering knowledge in the Roman Empire. Cambridge: Cambridge University Press. ISBN 9780511551062.
- Mauduit, C., ed. (2013). L'Onomasticon de Pollux : aspects culturels, rhétoriques et lexicographiques. Lyon: CEROR. ISBN 9782904974458.
- Theodoridis, Christos (2003). "Weitere Bemerkungen zum Onomastikon des Julius Pollux". Zeitschrift für Papyrologie und Epigraphik. 143: 71–78. ISSN 0084-5388. JSTOR 20191617.
- Zadorojnyi, Alexei (2019). "The Aesthetics and Politics of Inscriptions in Imperial Literature". In Petrovij, A; Petrovij, I; Thomas, E (eds.). The materiality of text : placement, perception, and presence of inscribed texts in classical antiquity. Leiden: Brill. pp. 48–68. ISBN 9789004379435.
