= Atys (son of Croesus) =

Figure in Herodotus' Histories, the son of the Lydian king Croesus

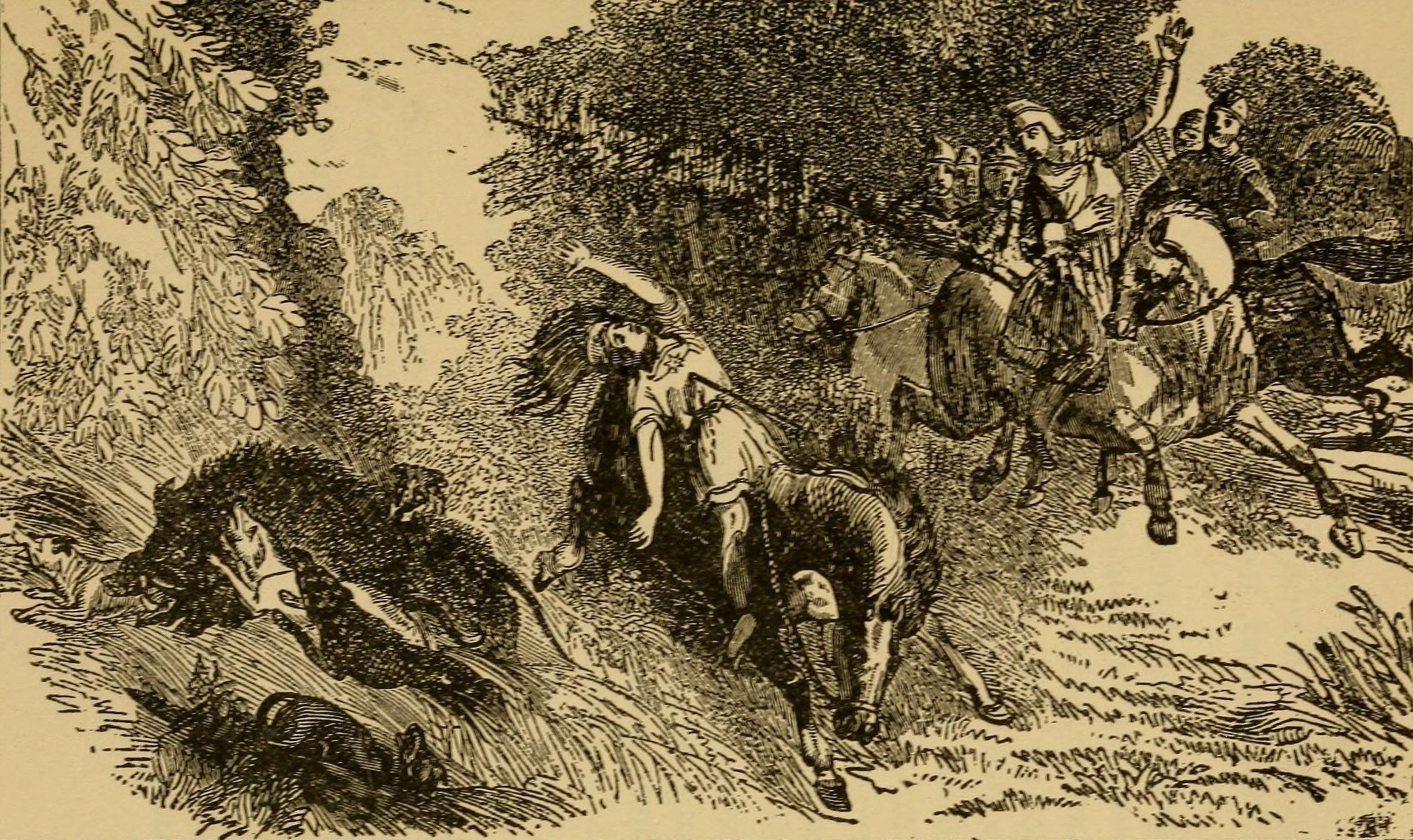
The death of Atys

Atys (Greek: Ἄτυς) was the son of Croesus king of Lydia. He had one son named Pythius.

According to Hdt. 1.35-45 (1, 35 to 45 of the Histories by Herodotus), Atys's father king Croesus had a dream, in which he saw his son Atys killed by a spear. As a result, Croesus, seeking to prevent or stave off the foreseen fate, had his son married immediately and ceased sending him out to war. One day a giant boar began terrorizing Mysian Olympus, and the Mysians sent to Croesus seeking relief. Croesus initially was unwilling to allow Atys to participate, but Atys talked his father into letting him go with a team of chosen young men and hounds to drive it off, arguing that boars do not wield iron weapons. Croesus gave his consent, but he sent Adrastus with him as a body guard. During the hunt, Adrastus accidentally killed Atys when hurling a spear at the boar, thus Croesus's dream came to pass. Riddled with guilt, Adrastus slew himself over the tomb of Atys. Hipponax of Ephesus mentions a tomb of Atys, which might be that of this prince.
