= Gordian Knot =

Greek myth; metaphor for tangled problem

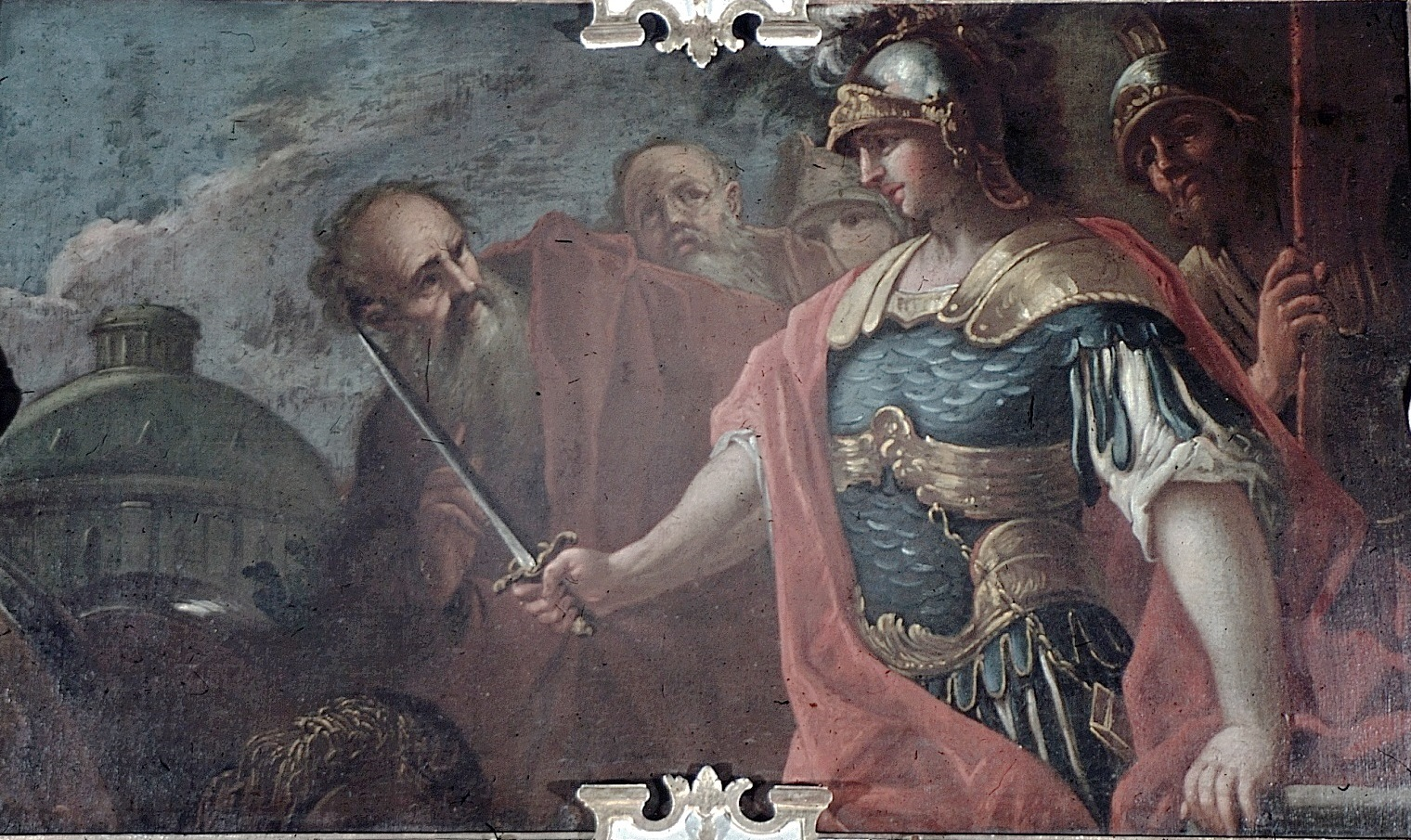
Alexander the Great cuts the Gordian Knot by Livio Retti (1692–1751)

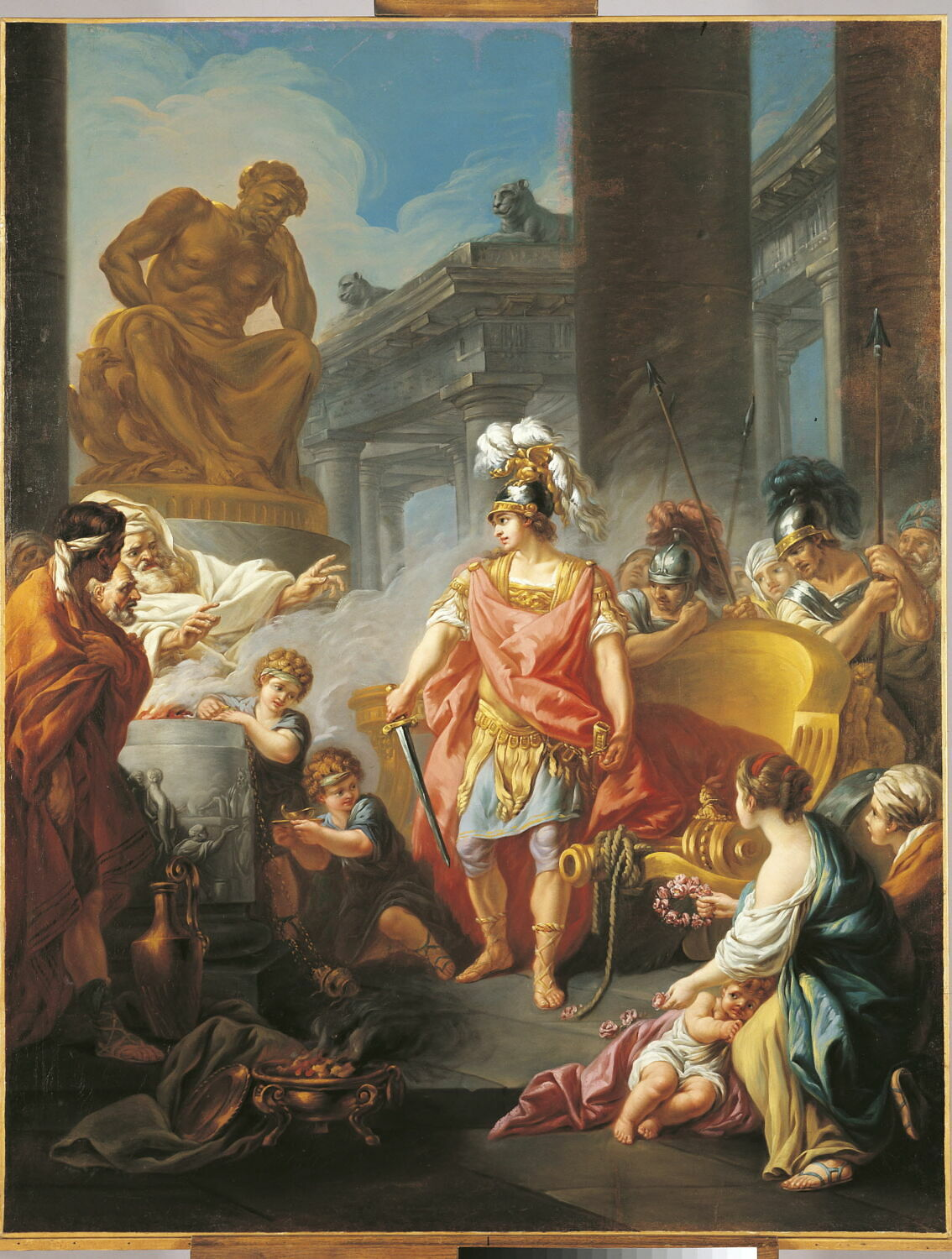
Alexander the Great Cutting the Gordian Knot (1767) by Jean-François Godefroy

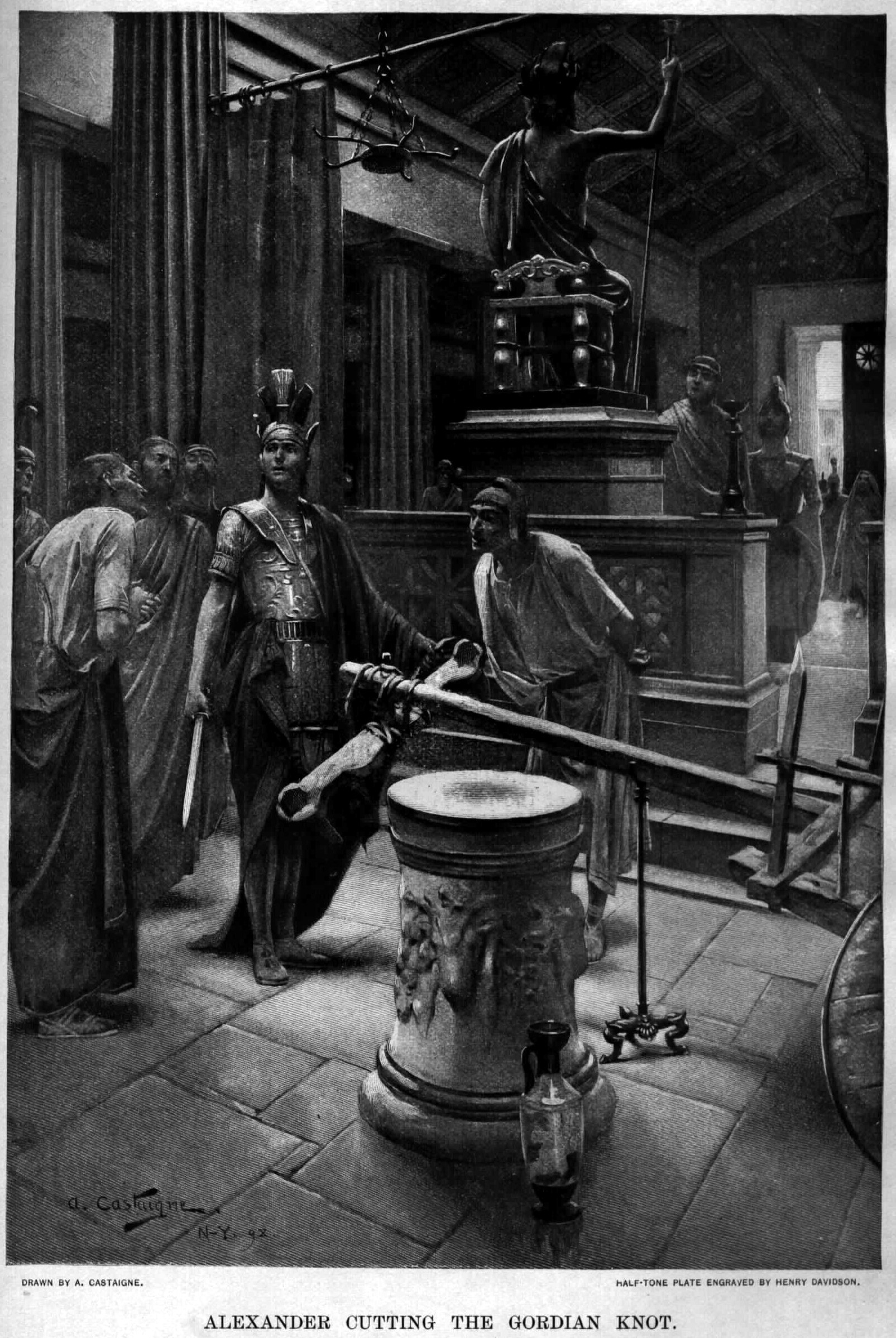
Alexander the Great Cutting the Gordian Knot by André Castaigne (1898–1899)

The cutting of the Gordian Knot is an ancient Greek legend associated with Alexander the Great in Gordium in Phrygia, regarding a complex knot that tied an oxcart. Reputedly, whoever could untie it would be destined to rule all of Asia. In 333 BC, Alexander was challenged to untie the knot. Instead of untangling it laboriously as everyone expected, he dramatically cut through it with his sword. This is used as a metaphor for inventing an unexpected method to solve a seemingly intractable problem.

== Legend ==
The Phrygians had no king, but an oracle at Telmissus (the ancient capital of Lycia) decreed that the next man to enter the city driving an ox-cart should become king. A peasant farmer named Gordias drove into town on an ox-cart and was immediately declared king. (Note: The ox-cart is often depicted in works of art as a chariot, which made it a more readily legible emblem of power and military readiness. His position had also been predicted earlier by an eagle landing on his cart, a sign to him from the gods.) Out of gratitude, his son Midas dedicated the ox-cart to the Phrygian god Sabazios (whom the Greeks identified with Zeus) and tied it to a post with an intricate knot of cornel bark (Cornus mas). The knot was later described by Roman historian Quintus Curtius Rufus as comprising "several knots all so tightly entangled that it was impossible to see how they were fastened".

The ox-cart still stood in the palace of the former kings of Phrygia at Gordium in the fourth century BC when Alexander the Great arrived, at which point Phrygia had been reduced to a satrapy, or province, of the Persian Empire. An oracle had declared that any man who could unravel its elaborate knots was destined to rule over all of Asia. Alexander the Great wanted to untie the knot but struggled to do so before reasoning that it would make no difference how the knot was loosed. Sources from antiquity disagree on his solution. In one version of the story, he drew his sword and sliced it in half with a single stroke. However, Plutarch and Arrian relate that, according to Aristobulus, (Note: Arrian and Plutarch are secondary sources; Aristobolus' text is lost.) Alexander pulled the linchpin from the pole to which the yoke was fastened, exposing the two ends of the cord and allowing him to untie the knot without having to cut through it. Some classical scholars regard this as more plausible than the popular account. Literary sources of the story include Arrian (Anabasis Alexandri 2.3), Quintus Curtius (3.1.14), Justin's epitome of Pompeius Trogus (11.7.3), and Aelian's De Natura Animalium 13.1.

Alexander the Great later went on to conquer Asia as far as the Indus and the Oxus, thus partially fulfilling the prophecy.

== Interpretations ==
The knot may have been a religious knot-cipher guarded by priests and priestesses. Robert Graves suggested that it may have symbolised the ineffable name of Dionysus that, knotted like a cipher, would have been passed on through generations of priests and revealed only to the kings of Phrygia.

Unlike popular fable, genuine mythology has few completely arbitrary elements. This myth taken as a whole seems designed to confer legitimacy to dynastic change in this central Anatolian kingdom: thus Alexander's "brutal cutting of the knot … ended an ancient dispensation."

The ox-cart suggests a longer voyage, rather than a local journey, perhaps linking Alexander the Great with an attested origin-myth in Macedon, of which Alexander is most likely to have been aware. Based on this origin myth, the new dynasty was not immemorially ancient, but had widely remembered origins in a local, but non-priestly "outsider" class, represented by Greek reports equally as an eponymous peasant or the locally attested, authentically Phrygian in his ox-cart. Roller (1984) separates out authentic Phrygian elements in the Greek reports and finds a folk-tale element and a religious one, linking the dynastic founder (with the cults of "Zeus" and Cybele).

Other Greek myths legitimize dynasties by right of conquest (compare Cadmus), but in this myth the stressed legitimising oracle suggests that the previous dynasty was a race of priest-kings allied to the unidentified oracular deity.

== See also ==
- Aporia
- Archimedean point
- Egg of Columbus
- Endless knot
- Gödel's loophole
- Kobayashi Maru
- Ouroboros
- Sovereignty
- Trefoil knot
- Thinking outside the box
- Yoke and arrows
- Wicked problem
- World riddle (German: Welträtsel)
