= Gordion =

Capital city of ancient Phrygia

- 𐊩𐌏𐌛𐊅𐊄𐌌
- Γόρδιον; Gordium; Gordiyon
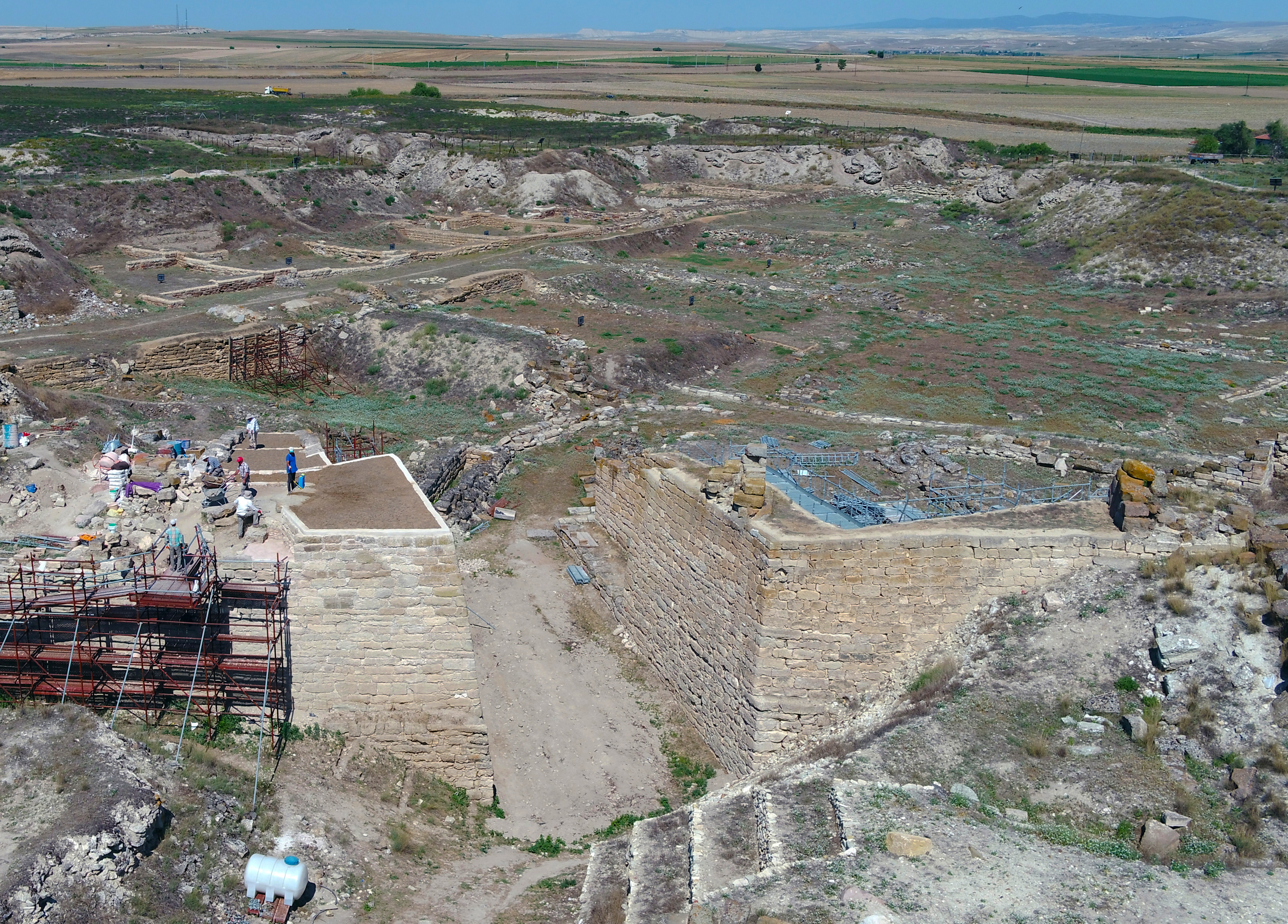
- The Early Phrygian East Citadel Gate at Gordion, with the Terrace Building Complex and Megaron buildings behind it

- Location within Turkey
- 39.650356°N 31.978243°E
- Type: Settlement
- Location: Yassıhüyük, Ankara Province, Turkey
- Region: Phrygia

Site notes
- Website: www.penn.museum/sites/gordion

UNESCO World Heritage Site
- Official name: Gordion
- Type: Cultural
- Criteria: (iii)
- Designated: 2023 (45th session)
- Reference no.: 1669
- UNESCO Region: Europe and North America

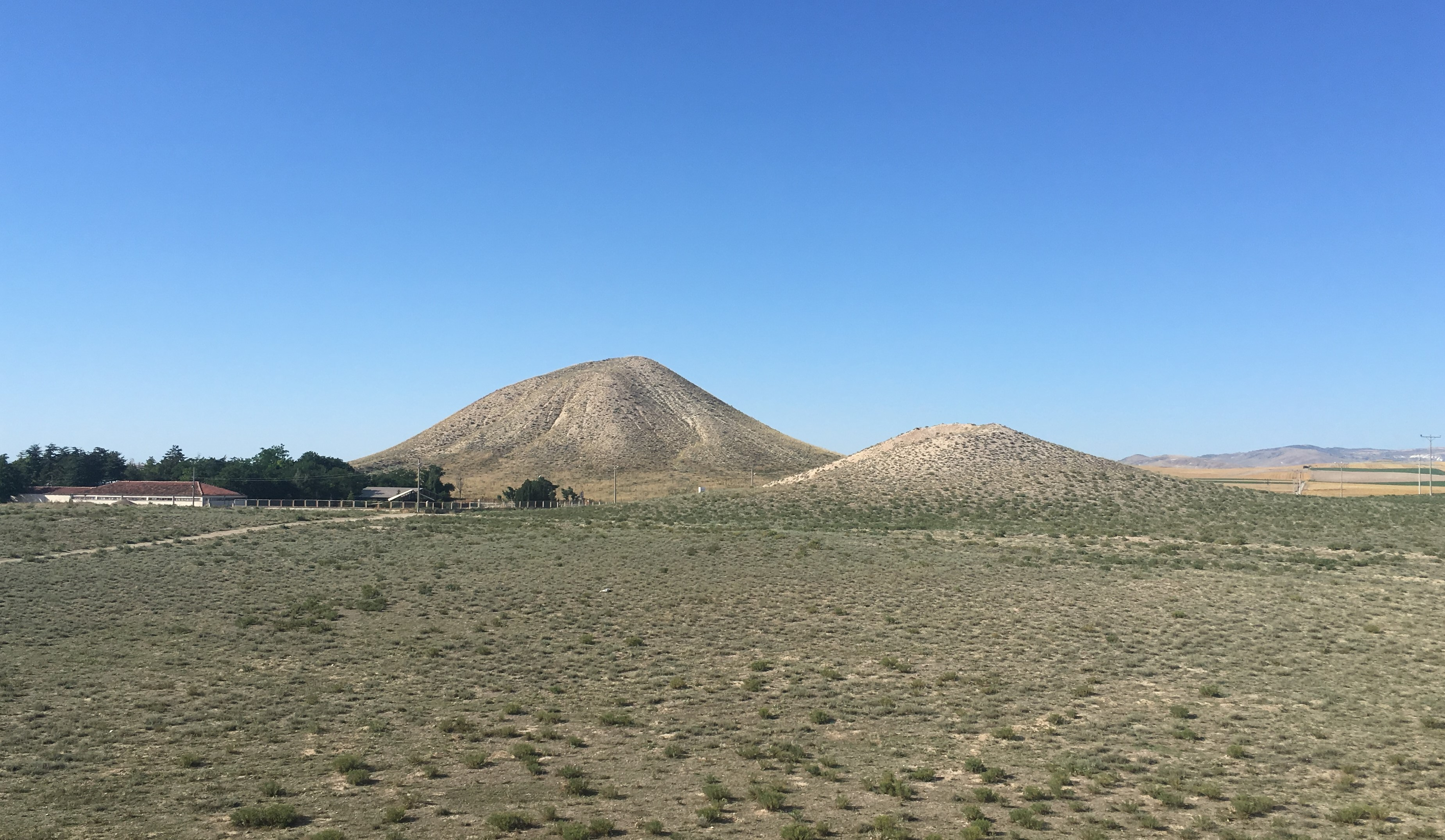
The 8th century BCE burial tumuli, Tumulus MM (left) and Tumulus P (right) at Gordion, Turkey

Gordion (Phrygian: 𐊩𐌏𐌛𐊅𐊄𐌌, romanised: Gordum; Ancient Greek: Γόρδιον, romanized: Górdion; Turkish: Gordion or Gordiyon; Latin: Gordium) was the capital city of ancient Phrygia. It was located at the site of modern Yassıhüyük, about 70–80 km (43–50 mi) southwest of Ankara (capital of Turkey), in the immediate vicinity of Polatlı district. Gordion's location at the confluence of the Sakarya and Porsuk rivers gave it a strategic location with control over fertile land. Gordion lies where the ancient road between Lydia and Assyria/Babylonia crossed the Sangarius river. Occupation at the site is attested from the Early Bronze Age (c. 2300 BCE) continuously until the 4th century CE and again in the 13th and 14th centuries CE. The Citadel Mound at Gordion is approximately 13.5 hectares in size, and at its height habitation extended beyond this in an area approximately 100 hectares in size. Gordion is the type site of Phrygian civilization, and its well-preserved destruction level of c. 800 BCE is a chronological linchpin in the region. The long tradition of tumuli at the site is an important record of elite monumentality and burial practice during the Iron Age.

In 2023, Gordion was listed as UNESCO World Heritage Site.

== Name ==
The Ancient Greek Górdion (Γόρδιον) comes from Phrygian 𐊩𐌏𐌛𐊅𐊄𐌌 (Gordum, literally “city”) ultimately from Proto-Indo-European *gʰórdʰ-os. The English placename Gordion comes from the Ancient Greek.

== History of occupation ==
In antiquity, the Sakarya river flowed on the east side of the Citadel Mound, just beyond the Küçük Höyük fort. Its course changed several times, ultimately moving to the west side of the mound, where it is now. This was a relatively recent change, most likely occurring during the 19th century.

Gordion Chronology
Period Name	Approximate Dates
Early Bronze Age	3000–2000 BCE
Middle Bronze Age	2000–1600 BCE
Late Bronze Age	1600–1200 BCE
Early Iron Age	1200–900 BCE
Early Phrygian Period	900–800 BCE
Middle Phrygian Period	800–540 BCE
Late Phrygian Period	540–330 BCE
Hellenistic Period	330–1st century BCE
Roman	1st–5th century CE
Medieval	13th–14th century CE
Modern Gordion	1920s–present

=== Bronze Age ===
Gordion was inhabited from at least the Early Bronze Age, c. 2300 BCE. By the end of this period it displayed ceramic commonalities with communities as far west as the Troad and as far east as Cilicia.

During the Middle Bronze Age, Gordion came under the influence of the Hittites, with administrative seals evident at the site. There is an extensive necropolis attested on the Northeast Ridge, with burials of the MH III-IV periods.

Late Bronze Age Gordion was part of the Hittite Empire and located at the western edge of its heartland.

=== Early Iron Age ===
There is a cultural change at Gordion in the Early Iron Age, with distinct differences from the Late Bronze Age in regard to architecture and ceramics. Ceramic and linguistic links with southeastern Europe point to an influx of Balkan migrants at this time, possibly the Brygians.

=== Early Phrygian period ===
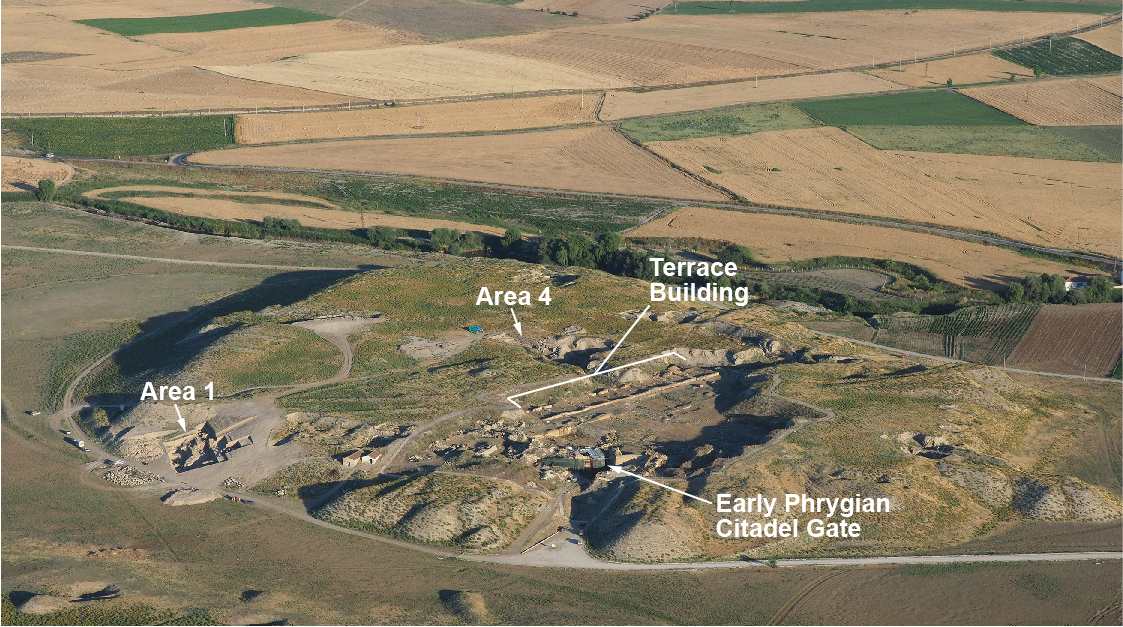
Aerial overview of the Citadel Mound of Gordion

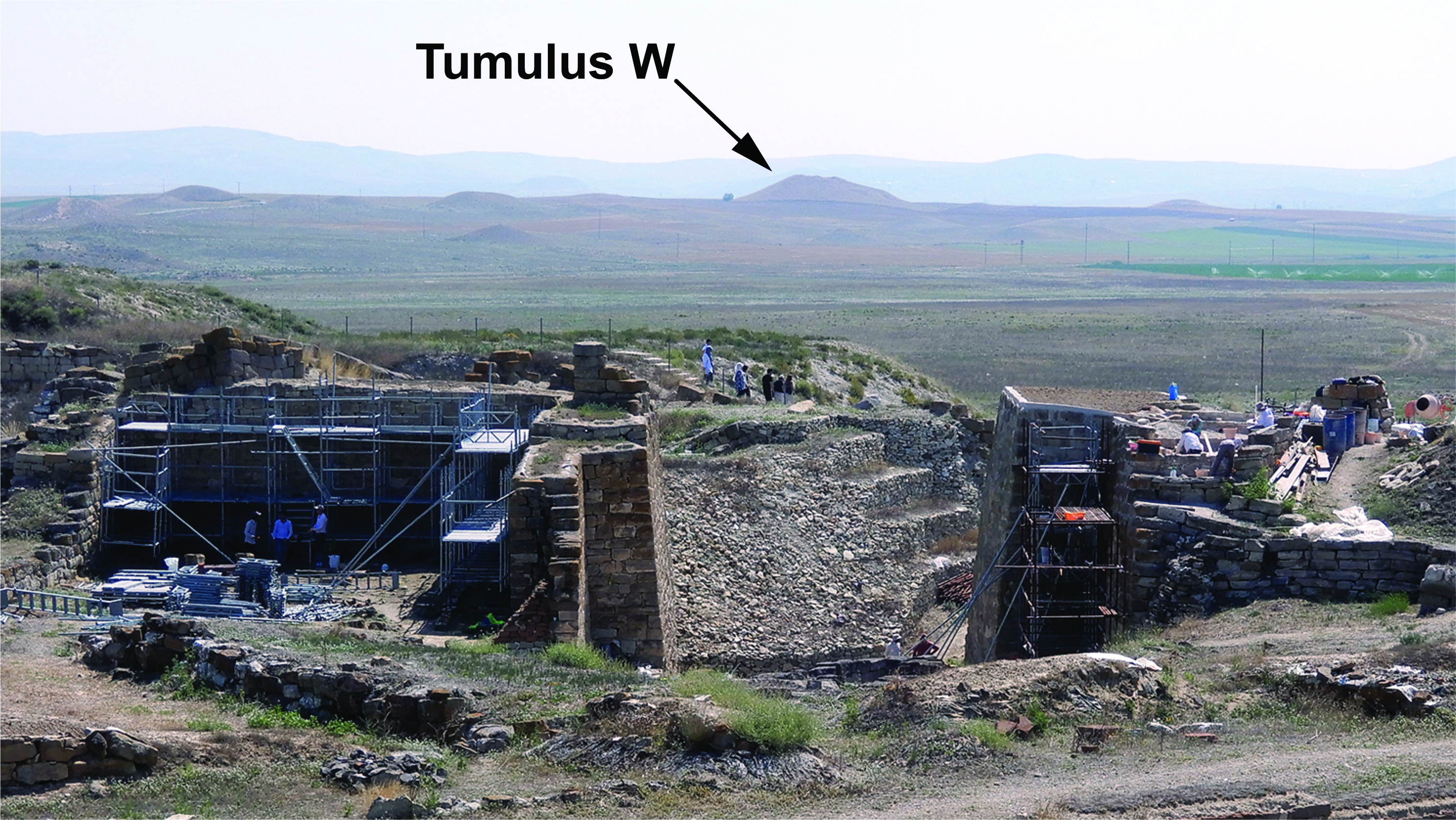
View through the Early Phrygian East Citadel Gate at Gordion looking at Tumulus W (c. 850 BCE)

There were several monumental construction projects on the citadel during the 10th and 9th centuries, the Early Phrygian period, resulting in a circuit wall around the Citadel Mound with an extensive gate complex. The East Citadel Gate provided both increased defense and a projection of power; it is still preserved to a height of ten metres, making it the best-preserved example in Anatolia. Around the same time, c. 850 BCE, Tumulus W was constructed, the first-known example of a tumulus burial in Anatolia and a marker of elite prominence at Gordion. Beyond the East Citadel Gate a series of elite buildings occupied the eastern side of the mound. These included several megaron-plan buildings and the large interconnected Terrace Building Complex. The Megarons at Gordion likely served an administrative function, with the largest, Megaron 3, perhaps serving as an audience hall. The Megarons include several pebble-mosaic floors with elaborate geometric designs, among the earliest-known examples of their type. The Terrace Building, a complex of eight interconnected buildings stretching more one hundred metres in length, was a locus of grinding, cooking and weaving as well as storage. The remains of the Early Phrygian period were preserved as the result of a conflagration on the eastern side of the Citadel Mound likely dating to c. 800 BCE. This destruction level and the subsequent rebuilding of the site above it preserved the architecture and many of the finds from the Early Phrygian period. The Early Phrygian period at the site is thus better understood than the Middle Phrygian.

==== Early Phrygian Destruction Level ====
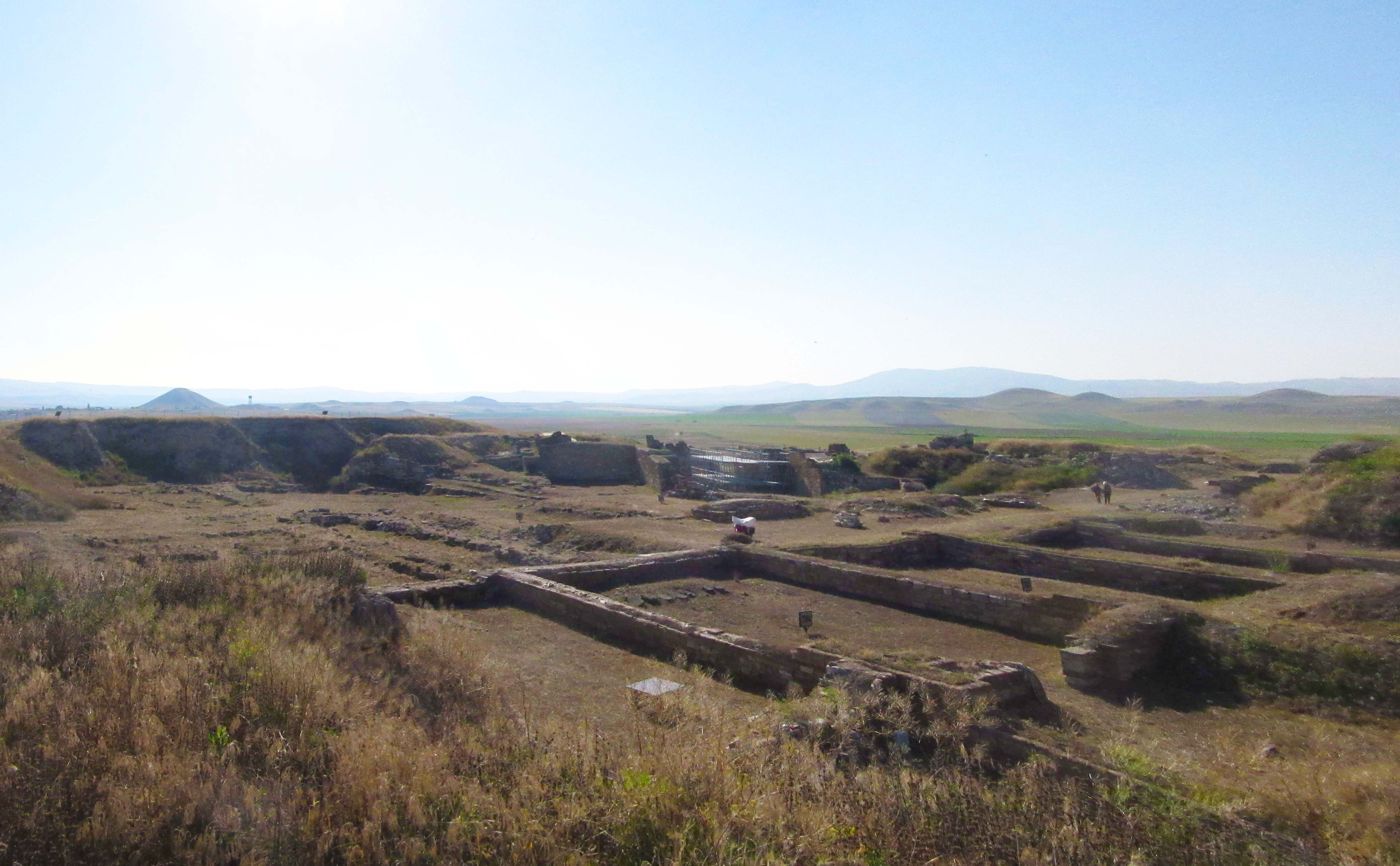
View of the Citadel Mound at Gordion. Early Phrygian Terrace Building Complex in the foreground with the East Citadel Gate behind it. Tumulus MM in the background to the left.

There is ample evidence of widespread burning of the eastern portion of the Citadel Mound of Gordion, in a level referred to by the initial excavator, Rodney S. Young, as the Destruction Level. This event, and the subsequent deposition of up to five metres of clay above the burnt level, sealed and preserved many buildings and hundreds of objects from the Early Phrygian phase, providing an astonishing insight into the character of the elite district of an Iron Age citadel, unique in Anatolian archaeology. As such the Early Phrygian Destruction Level provides well-dated comparative material for other sites in the region and constitutes a key fixed point in Central Anatolian chronology.

Archaeologists at first interpreted the Destruction Level as the remains of a Cimmerian attack, c. 700 BCE, an event referred to much later by Strabo and Eusebius as resulting in the death of King Midas. Initial radiocarbon data analyzed by Young cast some doubt on this interpretation, but the date of 700 BCE was widely used. Beginning in 2000, a renewed program of radiocarbon dating, dendrochronological analysis and closer examination of the objects in the Destruction Level began. Three factors were of particular importance: the establishment of the date of Tumulus MM at c. 740 BCE based on dendrochronology; the comparison of Destruction Level objects with those in Tumulus MM and other independently dated assemblages in the Gordion tumuli; and the study of well-known 8th-century Greek ceramics in post-Destruction-Level contexts. Taken altogether this research indicated that the date of the conflagration was approximately one hundred years earlier than previously thought, c. 800 BCE.

Initial criticism of the radiocarbon analysis focused on the preliminary publication of five samples but was subsequently refuted by the publication of fifteen more short-lived samples, each the average of dozens of barley, lentil and flax seeds from the Destruction Level. These all indicated a range c. 840–795 BCE, most likely between 830/815 and 810/800 BCE, and were in no way compatible with a c. 700 BCE date, even with extreme adjustments to the outliers within the data. Consequently the fire can no longer be associated with a Cimmerian incursion and was probably accidental in nature, with no indications of a military attack. A date of c. 800 BCE for the Early Phrygian Destruction Level has been widely accepted by scholars working throughout Central Anatolia, with objections voiced only by Muscarella and Keenan.

=== Middle Phrygian Period ===
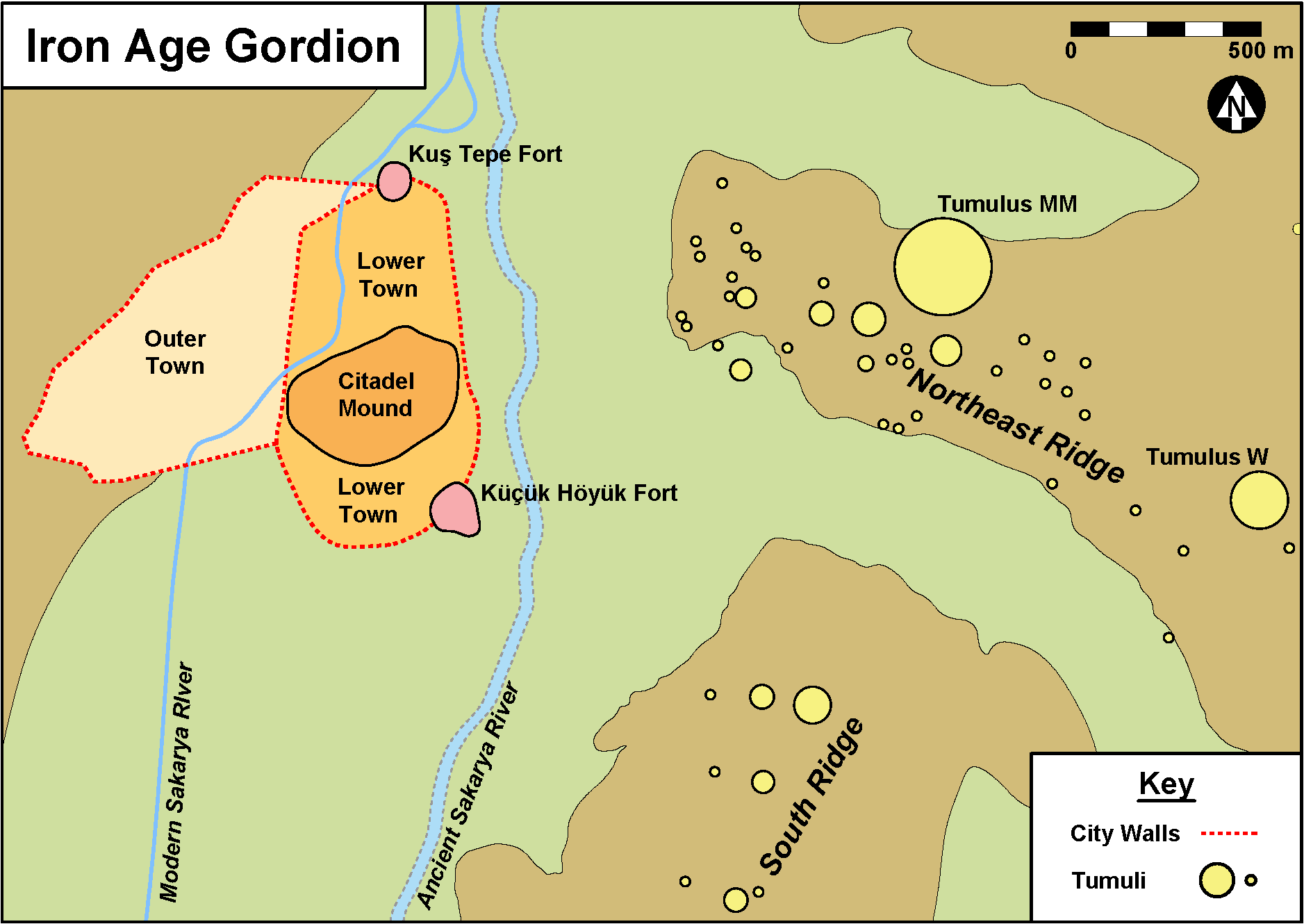
Overview of the main settlement and cemetery areas at Iron Age Gordion (after Rose and Darbyshire 2011 fig. 0.1, Rose 2017 fig. 9)

The c. 800 BCE destruction level marks the change from the Early Phrygian period to the Middle Phrygian. After the fire, the inhabitants of Gordion completed a massive construction program on the Citadel Mound that included the laying of up to five metres of clay to raise the height of the mound. The citadel was rebuilt on a largely similar plan, a process of monumentality that required an immense amount of labor and planning. The fortifications at Gordion at this time expanded to include a pair of forts to the north and south of the Citadel Mound connected by a circuit wall enclosing an area more than twenty-five hectares, the Lower Town. Beyond the Lower Town, settlement continued in the Outer Town, protected by a further wall and ditch. Settlement stretched onto the Northeast Ridge, where a series of houses was destroyed in an attack by an unknown enemy around 700 BCE. During the Middle Phrygian period Gordion grew to its largest size, encompassing an area of settlement of approximately one hundred hectares. At this time the political influence of Phrygia in Anatolia increased substantially. During the 9th and 8th centuries BCE the city grew into the capital of a kingdom that controlled much of Asia Minor west of the river Halys. In the course of the 6th century BCE the kingdom of Lydia, Phrygia's neighbor to the southwest, began to exert influence within Anatolia, likely at the expense of Phrygian control. The incursion of Cyrus the Great and the Achaemenid Empire into Anatolia, beginning in 546 BCE, spelled the end of any Lydian control and of Phrygian autonomy at Gordion.

==== King Midas ====
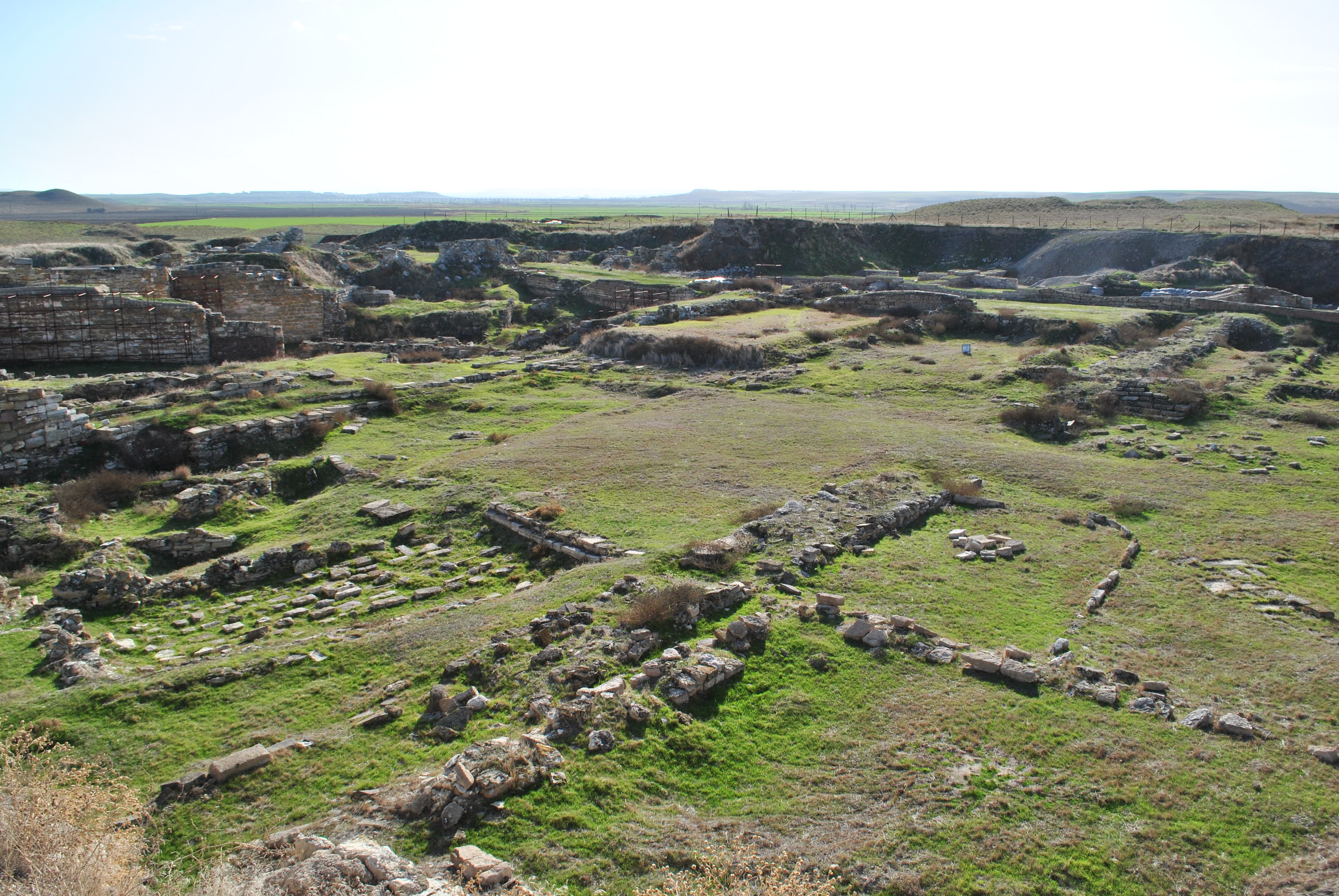
Gordion Archeological site during the spring

The most famous king of Phrygia was Midas, who reigned during the Middle Phrygian period at Gordion. He was likely on the throne at Gordion by c. 740 BCE, based on the completion of Tumulus MM around that time. Contemporary Assyrian sources dating between c. 718 and 709 BCE call him Mit-ta-a. According to the Greek historian Herodotus, King Midas was the first foreigner to make an offering at the sanctuary of Delphi's Temple of Apollo, dedicating the throne from which he gave judgment. During his reign, according to Strabo, the nomadic Cimmerians invaded Asia Minor and in 710/709 BCE Midas was forced to ask for help from the Assyrian king Sargon II. In Strabo's account King Midas committed suicide by drinking bull's blood when the Cimmerians overran the city.

==== Tumuli ====
There are more than one hundred tumuli in the vicinity of Gordion, dating from the 9th to the 6th centuries BCE. The largest of these burial mounds have traditionally been associated with kings, especially Tumulus MM. There are two main necropoleis, the Northeast Ridge and the South Ridge. Tumulus W at Gordion, dating to c. 850 BCE, is the earliest known at the site and the first known anywhere in Anatolia. Tumuli are associated with inhumation burials at Gordion until the late 7th century, when cremation began at the site. The two traditions then coexisted through the 6th century BCE.

===== Tumulus MM =====
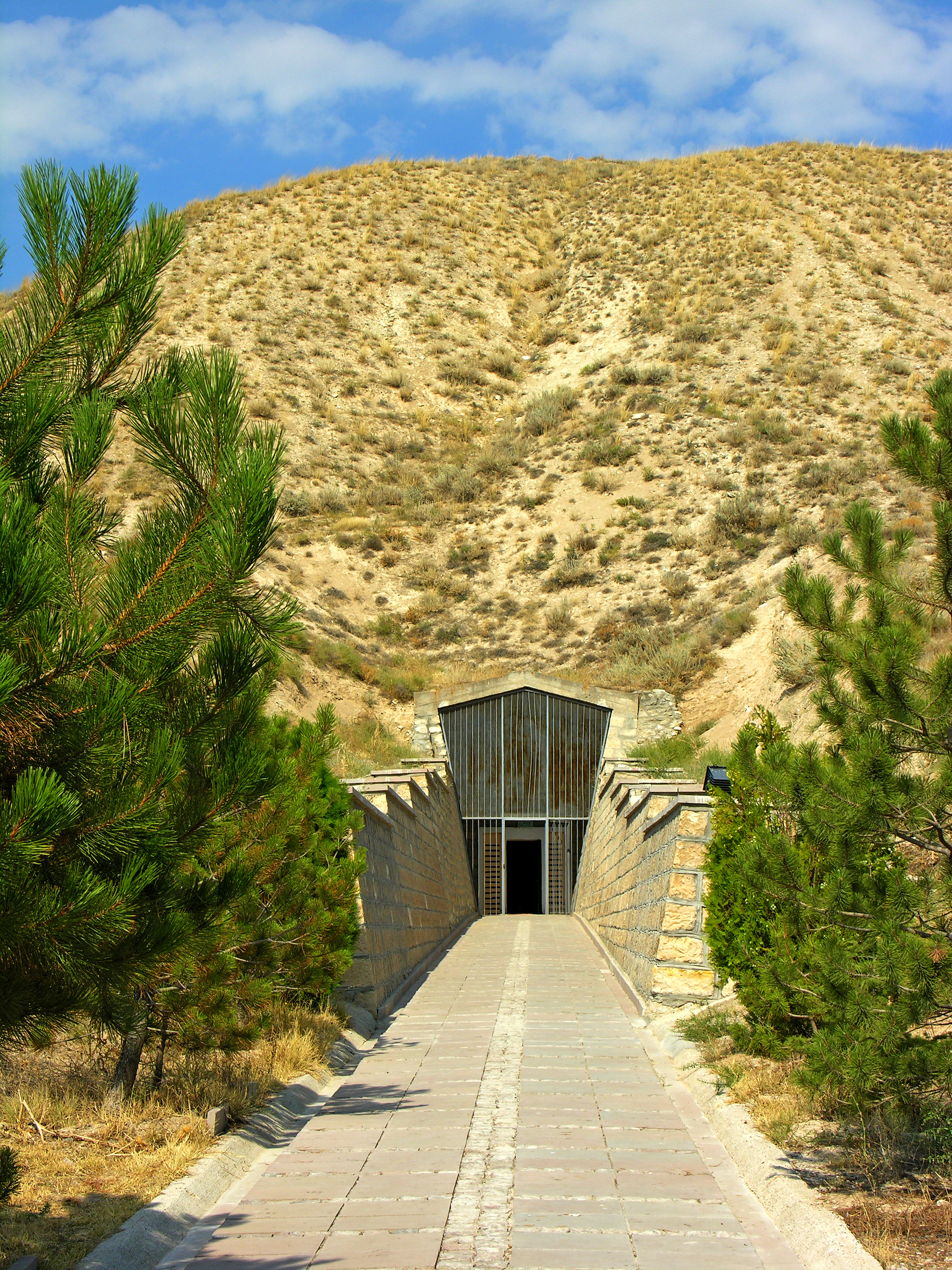
The Midas Mound Tumulus at Gordion, dated c. 740 BCE.

Tumulus MM (for "Midas Mound"), the Great Tumulus, is the largest burial mound at Gordion, standing more than fifty metres high today, with a diameter of about three hundred metres. It was built c. 740 BCE, and at that time was the largest tumulus in Anatolia, only surpassed c. 200 years later by the Tumulus of Alyattes in Lydia. Tumulus MM was excavated in 1957 by Young's team, revealing the remains of the royal occupant resting on purple and golden textiles in an open log coffin, surrounded by a vast array of magnificent objects. The burial goods included pottery and bronze vessels containing organic residues, bronze fibulae (ancient safety pins), leather belts with bronze attachments and an extraordinary collection of carved and inlaid wooden furniture, exceptional for its state of preservation. The Tumulus MM funeral ceremony has been reconstructed and scientists have determined that the guests at the banquet ate lamb or goat stew and drank a mixed fermented beverage. Now generally assumed to be the tomb of Midas' father Gordias, it was probably the first monumental project of Midas after his accession.

=== Late Phrygian Period ===
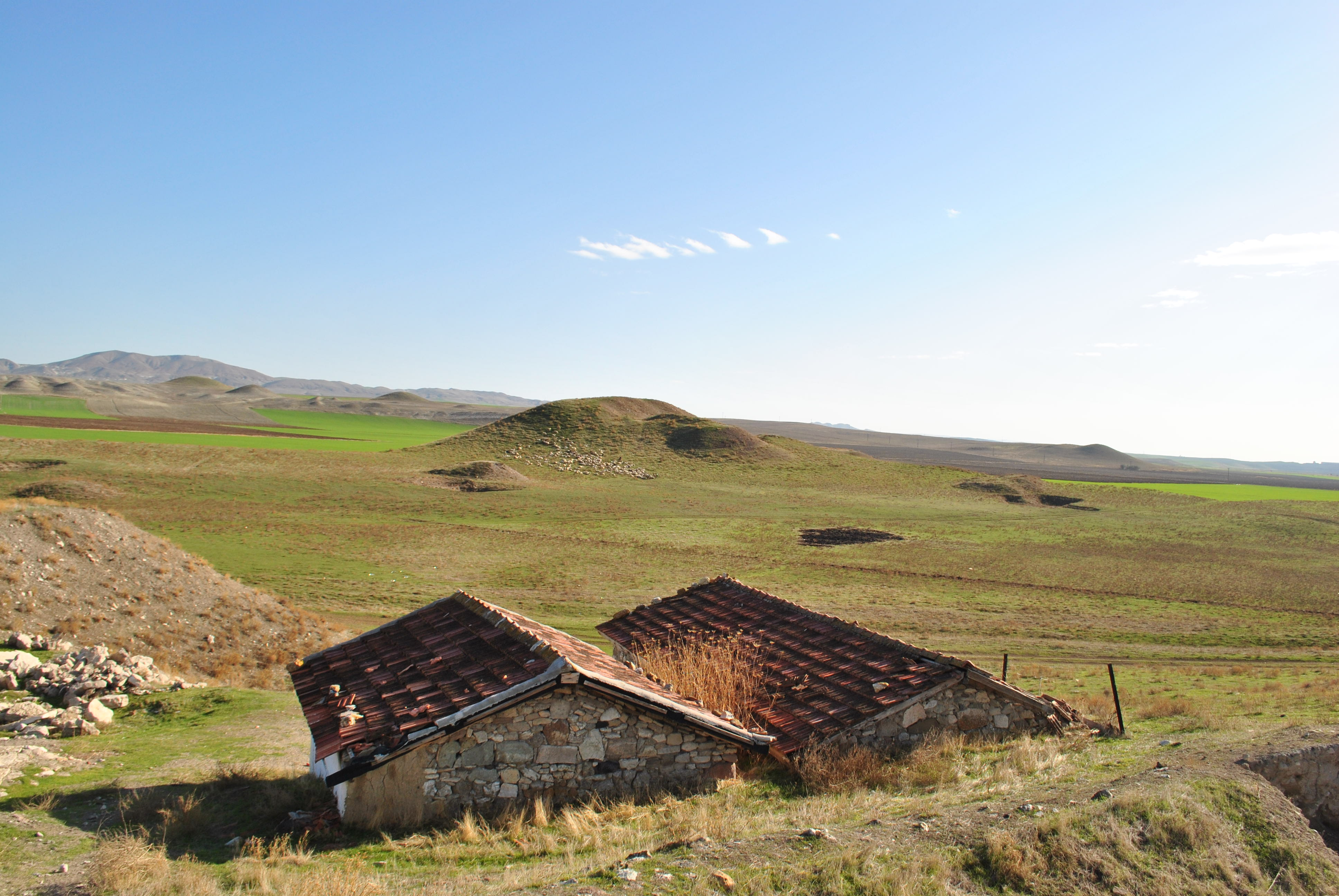
The fort at Küçük Höyük, destroyed in the Persian attack of 546 BCE

Following the campaigns of Cyrus the Great in Anatolia in the 540s BCE, Gordion became part of the Achaemenid Persian Empire. There is extensive evidence for the Persian siege of 546 BCE at Gordion, mainly associated with the fort at Küçük Höyük. The Persian attackers built a large siege ramp to assault the fortress, still visible today. After its conquest, Gordion became part of the satrapy of Hellespontine Phrygia, which had Daskyleion on the Sea of Marmara, not Gordion, as its capital. Despite its relegation in status, Gordion initially continued to prosper under the Achaemenids, with tumulus burials and monumental buildings maintained through the 6th century. Around 500 BCE, a semi-subterranean structure, the Painted House, was added to the east side of the Citadel Mound. It featured a program of wall frescoes showing the procession of women. It is perhaps associated with cultic activity, although the nature of this is uncertain.

The 4th century BCE at Gordion began with the combination of an earthquake and the attack of the Spartan king Agesilaos. The subsequent century saw an absence of monumental buildings on the Citadel Mound, and, in fact, stone from many of the earlier structures was used for smaller buildings elsewhere around the site.

=== Hellenistic Period ===
The advent of Alexander in 333 BCE precipitated a major change at the site, with worship of Greek deities, inscriptions in Greek, and Greek pottery all replacing their Phrygian predecessors at the site. The middle of the 3rd century BCE saw the arrival of the Galatians, a Celtic people who first came to Anatolia as mercenaries hired by Nicomedes I of Bithynia. The Galatians ultimately settled in Phrygia, including at Gordion. The settlement at Gordion during the Hellenistic period shows a distinctly residential character, with large houses built over the public buildings on the Citadel Mound and no evidence of habitation in the Lower or Outer Towns. In 189 BCE, the Roman consul Gnaeus Manlius Vulso campaigned through Galatia, forcing the inhabitants of Gordion to temporarily abandon the site. Gordion was briefly reinhabited but abandoned again sometime during the 1st century BCE.

==== Gordian Knot ====
According to ancient tradition, in 333 BCE Alexander the Great cut (or otherwise unfastened) the Gordian Knot: this intricate knot joined the yoke to the pole of a Phrygian wagon that stood on the acropolis of the city. The wagon was associated with Midas or Gordias (or both) and was connected with the dynasty's rise to power. A local prophecy had decreed that whoever could loosen the knot was destined to become the ruler of Asia.

=== Roman Period ===
The Roman period at Gordion stretches from the 1st century CE through the 4th century, with a series of occupations and abandonments on the western part of the Citadel Mound. The Roman road between Ancyra and Pessinus passed through Gordion, which may have been known as Vindia or Vinda at this time. The Roman buildings at Gordion were oriented to cardinal directions and built as part of a deliberate refoundation that included leveling the surface of the western part of the mound. The area of the Common Cemetery includes Roman burials from the 2nd to 4th centuries CE.

=== Medieval Period ===
Evidence for the Medieval Period at Gordion is sparse but suggests habitation during the 13th and 14th centuries CE with at least some fortification. Recent excavations have revealed lime-coated pits and ovens on the western side of the Citadel Mound, signalling food preparation and storage.

=== Modern ===
Gordion lay along the front lines of the 1921 Battle of the Sakarya, the turning point of the Greco-Turkish War of 1919–1922. The Citadel Mound and several of the tumuli were used as defensive positions during the three weeks of fighting. The village of Bebi, located to the west of the Citadel Mound, was the main site of habitation in the area during the 19th and 20th centuries but was destroyed during the course of the battle. The modern village of Yassıhöyük was established in the aftermath of the Turkish War of Independence. It is part of the Polatlı district.

== Archaeological research ==
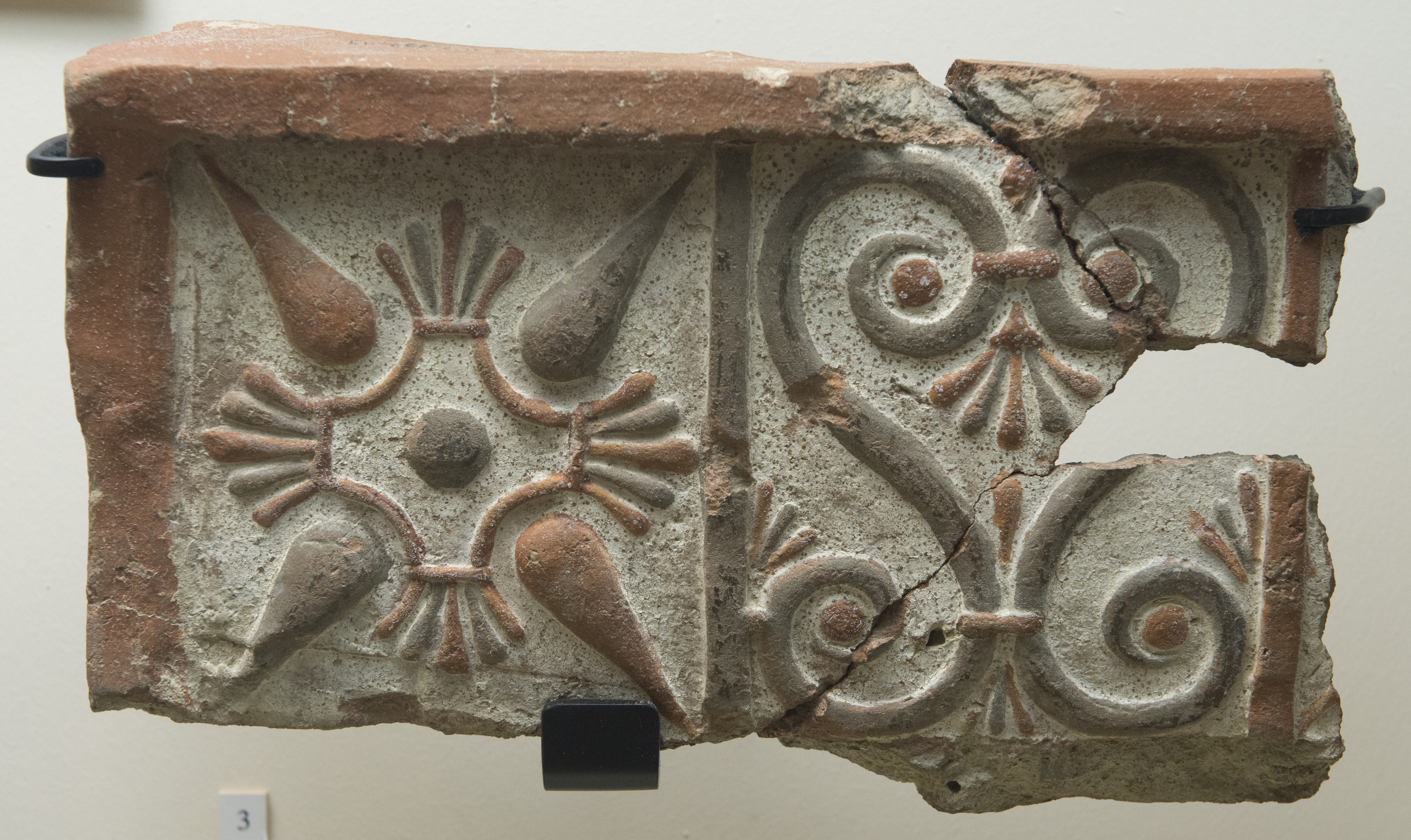
Phrygian architectural terracotta at Gordion Museum

=== History of research ===
The site was excavated by Gustav Körte and Alfred Körte in 1900 and then by the University of Pennsylvania Museum of Archaeology and Anthropology, under the direction of Rodney S. Young, between 1950 and 1973. Excavations have continued at the site under the auspices of the University of Pennsylvania Museum with an international team, directed by Keith DeVries (1977–1987), G. Kenneth Sams and Mary M. Voigt (1988–2006), G. Kenneth Sams and C. Brian Rose (2006–2012), and C. Brian Rose (2012–present). Finds from Gordion are on display at the Museum of Anatolian Civilizations in Ankara, the Istanbul Archaeological Museums, and the Gordion Museum, located in Yassıhöyük itself.

=== Current research ===
==== Excavation ====
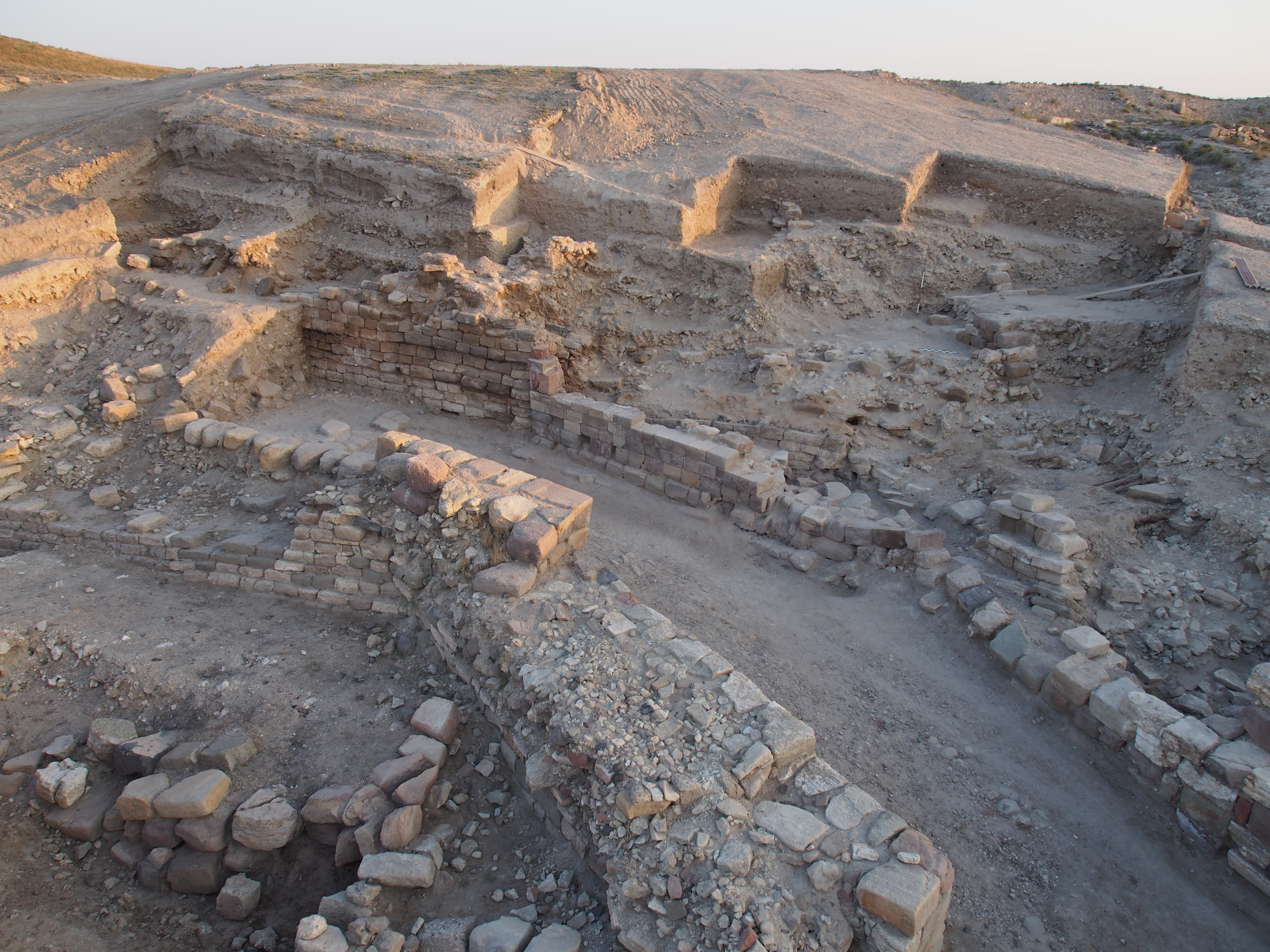
Approach road to the South Gate at Gordion

The Gordion Project renewed excavations in 2013, focusing on the southern fortifications and revealing a new approach and gateway to the Citadel Mound. This new South Gate was originally constructed during the 9th century BCE, broadly contemporaneous with the Early Phrygian phase of the East Citadel Gate. The South Gate approach saw further modification with bastions added in the 8th and 6th centuries, and the walled causeway leading to the gate ultimately reached over 65 m long, the longest known for a citadel gate in Anatolia. As elsewhere on the Citadel Mound, the Middle Phrygian phase of the South Gate made use of large polychromatic blocks. In 2017 a sculpted stone lion was discovered at the entrance to the South Gate.

==== Architectural conservation ====
Since 2009, the project has undertaken a renewed program of architectural conservation on the Terrace Building Complex on the Citadel Mound, the large industrial quarter that burned in the Destruction Level c. 800 BCE. From 2014 to 2019, the architectural conservation team focused its efforts on restoring the South Bastion of the East Citadel Gate, affected by an earthquake in 1999. This project consolidated cracked stones, reinstalled them in the wall faces with stainless-steel supports, and addressed the drainage of the South Bastion through the repair of damaged masonry and the installation of a new capping support system.

==== Remote sensing ====
Since 2007, another primary focus of the Gordion Project has been the exploration of the city's defensive fortifications beyond the Citadel Mound through remote sensing. The use of magnetometry, electrical resistivity tomography, and ground-penetrating radar have allowed for a more complete reconstruction of the defense network and urban districts of the city during the Iron Age, providing evidence for a ditch and wall system surrounding the Outer Town to the west and confirming the existence of a second fort protecting the Lower Town at Kuş Tepe to the north.

==== Publication ====
The results of the excavations at Gordion are the subject of study for an international team of scholars, with ongoing research into all periods of the site's history.

== Ancient sources ==
Gordion is mentioned in the following ancient sources: Xenophon Hellenica 1.4.1; Hellenica Oxyrhynchia 21.6; Plutarch Life of Alexander 18; Justin, History of the World 11.7; Polybius Histories 21.37.1; Livy History of Rome 38.18; Strabo Geography 12.5.3, 12.8.9; Pliny the Elder Natural History 5.42; Arrian Anabasis 1.29.1–2, 2.3.1; Suda omi.221; Stephanus of Byzantium Ethnica G211.1.

== Final excavation reports ==
- Young, Rodney et al. 1981. The Gordion Excavations (1950–1973) Final Reports, Vol. I: Three Great Early Tumuli [P, MM, W]. Philadelphia: University of Pennsylvania Museum.
- Kohler, Ellen L. 1995. The Gordion Excavations (1950–1973) Final Reports, Vol. II: The Lesser Phrygian Tumuli, Part 1, The Inhumations. Philadelphia: University of Pennsylvania Museum.
- Gunter, Ann C. 1991. Gordion Excavations Final Reports Vol. III: The Bronze Age. Philadelphia: University of Pennsylvania Museum.
- Sams, G. Kenneth. 1994. The Gordion Excavations, 1950–1973: Final Reports, Vol. IV: The Early Phrygian Pottery. Philadelphia: University of Pennsylvania Museum.
