= Gordias =

In Greek mythology, the king of Phrygia

Gordias /ˈɡɔːrdiəs/ (Ancient Greek: Γορδίας, romanized: Gordías; also Γόρδιος, Górdios, 'Gordius') was the name of at least two members of the royal house of Phrygia.

The best-known Gordias was reputedly the founder of the Phrygian capital city Gordium, the maker of the legendary Gordian Knot, and the father of the legendary King Midas who turned whatever he touched to gold. The various legends about this Gordias and Midas imply that they lived sometime in the 2nd millennium BC.

== Gordias (father of Midas) ==
In the founding myth of Gordium, the first Gordias was a poor farmer from Macedonia who was the last descendant of the royal family of Bryges. When an eagle landed on the pole of his ox-cart, he interpreted it as a sign that he would one day become a king. The eagle did not stir as he drove the cart to the oracle of Sabazios at the old, more easterly cult center, Telmissus, in the part of Phrygia that later became part of Galatia. At the gates of the city he encountered a seeress, who counselled him to offer sacrifices to Zeus/Sabazios:

"Let me come with you, peasant," she said, "to make sure that you select the right victims." "By all means," replied Gordius. "You appear to be a wise and considerate young woman. Are you prepared to marry me?" "As soon as the sacrifices have been offered," she answered.

Meanwhile, the Phrygians, suddenly finding themselves without a king, consulted the oracle and were told to acclaim as king the first man to ride up to the temple in a cart. It was the farmer Gordias who appeared, riding in his ox-cart with his patroness.

Gordias founded the city of Gordium, which became the Phrygian capital. His ox-cart was preserved in the acropolis. In this manner the founding myth justified the succession of Gordium to Telmessos as cult center of Phrygia. Its yoke was secured with an intricate knot called the Gordian Knot. The legend of Gordium, widely disseminated by the publicists of Alexander the Great, said that he who could unravel it would be master of Asia (which was equated at the time with Anatolia). Instead, Alexander sliced the knot in half with his sword, in 333 BC.

Arrian has Midas, Gordias's son, assuming kingship instead of his father.

In some accounts, Gordias and the Phrygian goddess Cybele adopted Midas. In other accounts, Midas was their son. Herodotus says Midas was Gordias's son and does not mention Cybele. Herodotus also says that Gordias's son Midas had a garden in Macedonia, which could imply that Herodotus believed Gordias lived before the legendary Phrygian migration to Anatolia.

== Gordias (Herodotus) ==
According to Herodotus, another member of the Phrygian royal line named Gordias was a contemporary of Croesus of Lydia. His son Adrastus accidentally killed his own brother and fled to Lydia where Croesus gave him asylum. Phrygia was a Lydian subject at this time. This Gordias was the son of another Midas. Herodotus does not mention if this Gordias was still alive when Adrastus fled, or if this Gordias or his father Midas ever reigned as (vassal) kings. This Gordias and Midas pair are otherwise unknown.

Some historians believe Herodotus used the name Gordias for the father of another Midas still, who ruled Phrygia in the late 8th century BC. Herodotus wrote that a "Midas, son of Gordias" donated a throne to the Oracle of Delphi. This Midas, of the late 8th century BC, had a Greek wife and strong ties to the Greeks, which suggests it was he who made the offering; but Herodotus also says Gyges of Lydia, a contemporary of this Midas, was "the first foreigner since Midas" to make an offering at Delphi, which suggests Herodotus believed the throne was donated by the more ancient Midas.
