= Anchurus =

Mythical son of Midas

In Greek mythology, Anchurus (Ancient Greek: Ἄγχουρος, romanized: Ánchouros or Ankhouros, lit. 'near the mountain' or 'neighboring the mountain'), also called Aegisteus (Ancient Greek: Αἰγίστεος), was a Phrygian prince as the son of Midas—the heavily mythologized but still historical king of Phrygia.

== Mythology ==
During Midas' reign, a massive chasm in the earth opened up in the area of the town of Celaenae in Phyrgia due to the wrath of Idaean Zeus—flooding water and dragging many houses along with their inhabitants into the depths. Anchurus' king father consulted the oracle about how the opening might be closed and the latter was commanded to throw into it the most precious thing he possessed. He accordingly threw into it a great quantity of gold, silver, and women's jewelry but the chasm still did not close. Anchurus (Aegisteus), thinking that human life was the most precious of all things, embraced his father and bid farewell to his wife Timothea, he urged his horse forward with great speed into the place where the earth had split apart, and plunging down while sitting upon his horse, the ground immediately closed together.
