= Sabazios =

Deity of Phrygian origin also favoured in the Balkans

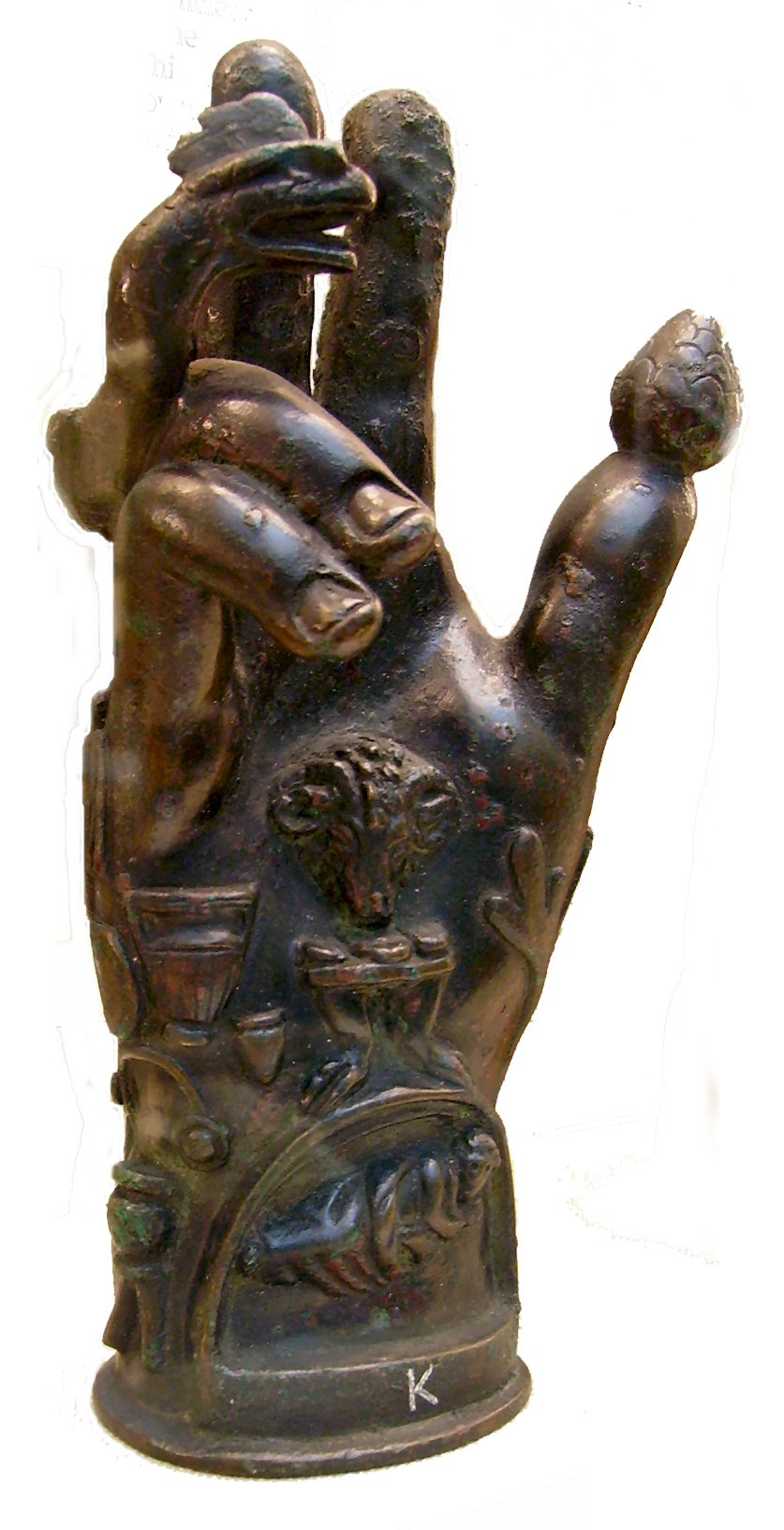
Bronze hand used in the worship of Sabazios (British Museum). Roman 1st–2nd century CE. Hands decorated with religious symbols were designed to stand in sanctuaries or, like this one, were attached to poles for processional use. Another similar bronze hand found in the 16th/17th century in Tournai, Belgium, is also in the British Museum.

Sabazios (Ancient Greek: Σαβάζιος, romanized: Sabázios, modern pronunciation Savázios; alternatively, Sabadios) is a deity originating in Asia Minor. He is the horseman and sky father god of the Phrygians and Thracians.

Sabazios gained prominence across the Roman Empire, particularly favored in the Central Balkans due to Thracian influence. Scholars have long debated Sabazios' origins, with current consensus leaning towards his Phrygian roots.

Though the Greeks interpreted Phrygian Sabazios as both Zeus and Dionysus, representations of him, even into Roman times, show him always on horseback, wielding his characteristic staff of power.

== Epigraphic evidence ==
According to scholars, the deity's name is variously written in epigraphy: Σεβάζιος, Σαβάζοις, Sabazius, Sabadius, Σαβασεἷος.

== Thracian/Phrygian Sabazios ==
It seems likely that the migrating Phrygians brought Sabazios with them when they settled in Anatolia in the early first millennium BCE, and that the god's origins are to be looked for in Macedonia and Thrace. The ancient sanctuary of Perperikon in modern-day Bulgaria, uncovered in 2000, is believed to be that of Sabazios.

Possible early conflict between Sabazios and his followers and the indigenous mother goddess of Phrygia (Cybele) may be reflected in Homer's brief reference to the youthful feats of Priam, who aided the Phrygians in their battles with Amazons. An aspect of the compromise religious settlement, similar to the other such mythic adjustments throughout Aegean culture, can be read in the later Phrygian King Gordias' adoption "with Cybele" of Midas.

One of the native religion's creatures was the Lunar Bull. Sabazios' relations with the goddess may be surmised in the way that his horse places a hoof on the head of the bull, in a Roman marble relief at the Boston Museum of Fine Arts. Though Roman in date, the iconic image appears to be much earlier.

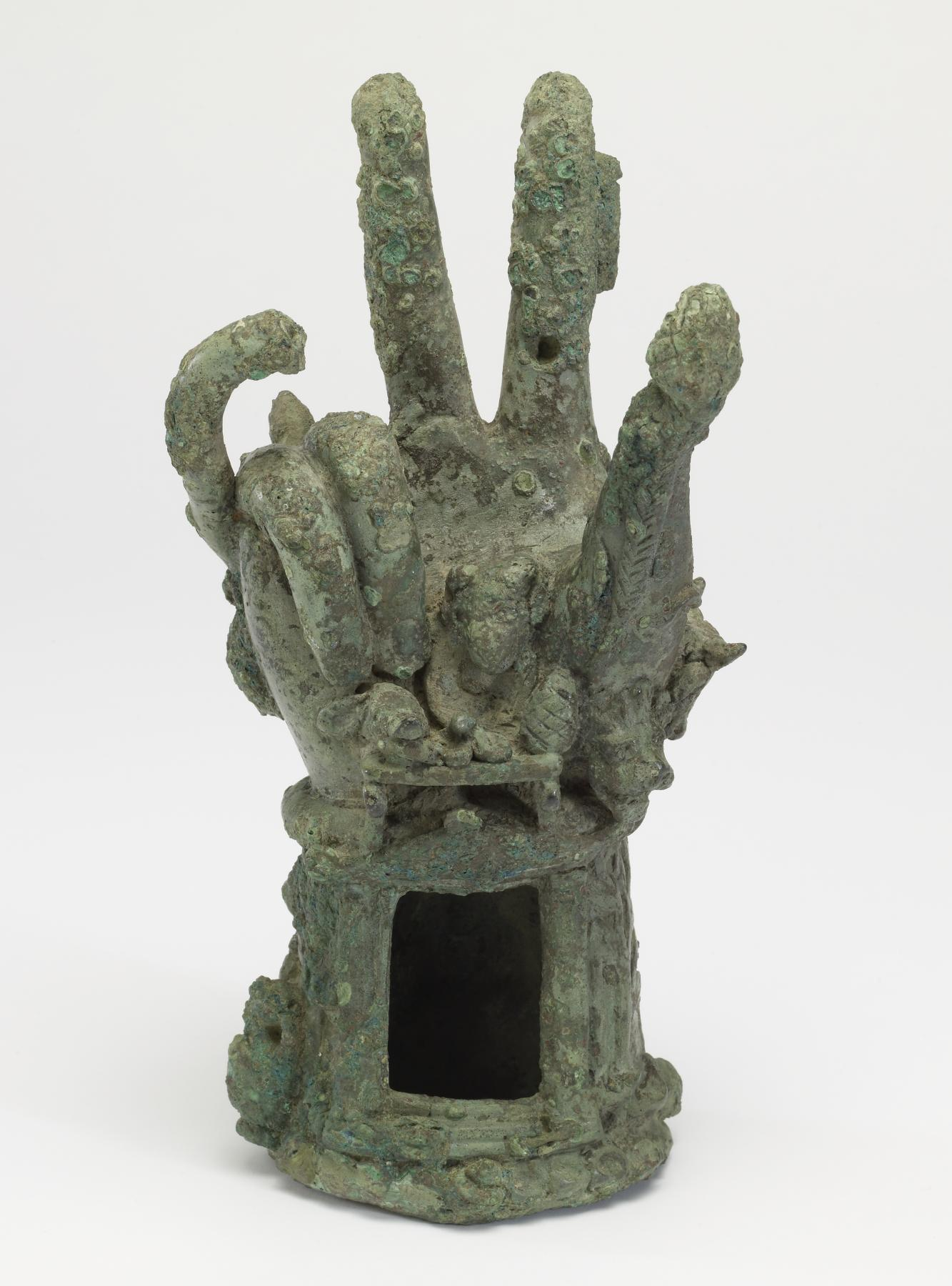
This copper alloy Roman hand of Sabazios was used in ritual worship. Few hands remain in collections today. Walters Art Museum, Baltimore.

== God on horseback ==
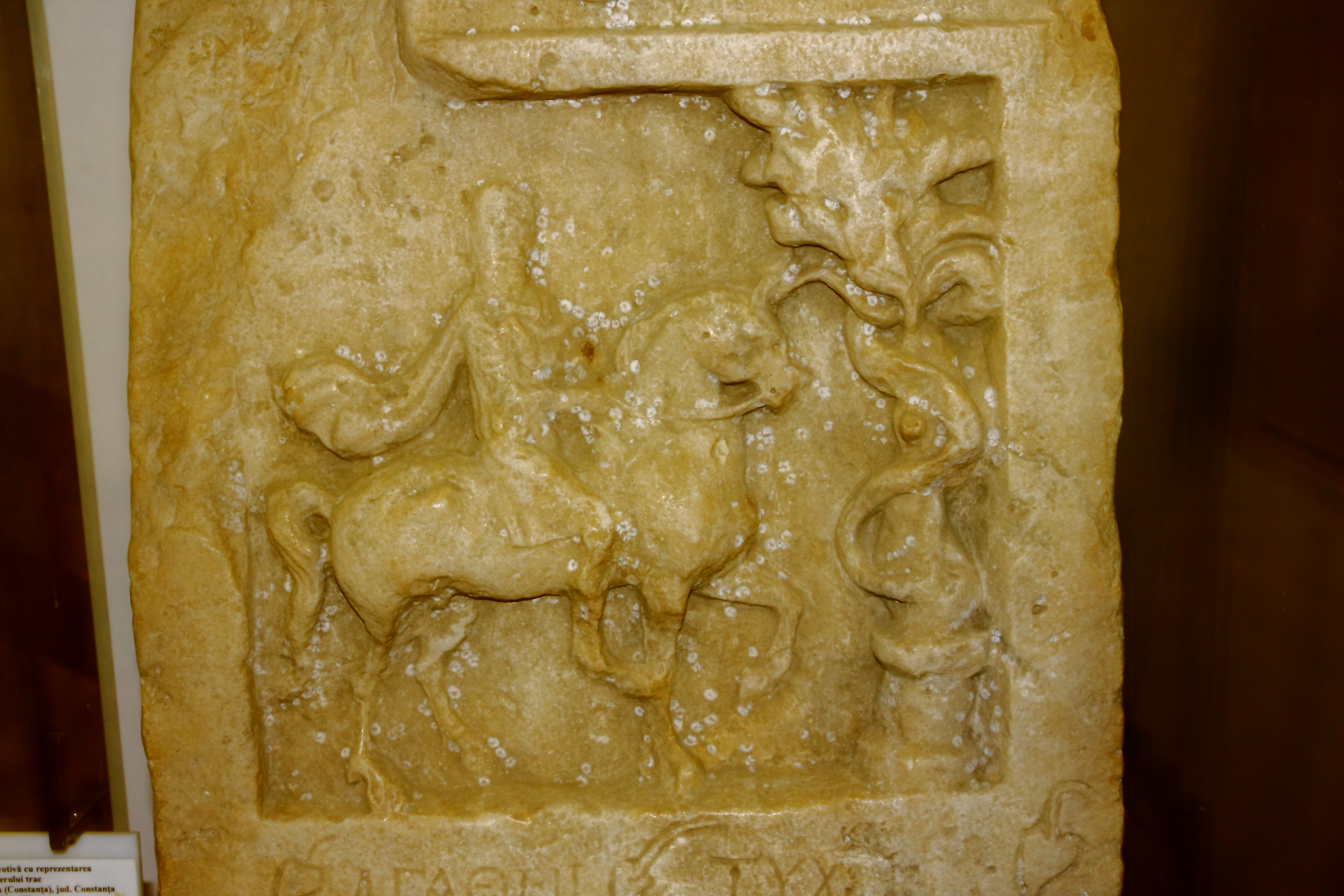
Thracian horseman, National Museum of Romanian History

More "rider god" steles are at the Burdur Museum, in Turkey. Under the Roman Emperor Gordian III the god on horseback appears on coins minted at Tlos, in neighboring Lycia, and at Istrus, in the province of Lower Moesia, between Thrace and the Danube. It is generally thought that the young emperor's grandfather came from an Anatolian family, because of his unusual cognomen, Gordianus. The iconic image of the god or hero on horseback battling the chthonic serpent, on which his horse tramples, appears on Celtic votive columns, and with the coming of Christianity it was easily transformed into the image of Saint George and the Dragon, whose earliest known depictions are from tenth- and eleventh-century Cappadocia and eleventh-century Georgia and Armenia.

== Iconography, depictions, and Hellenistic associations ==
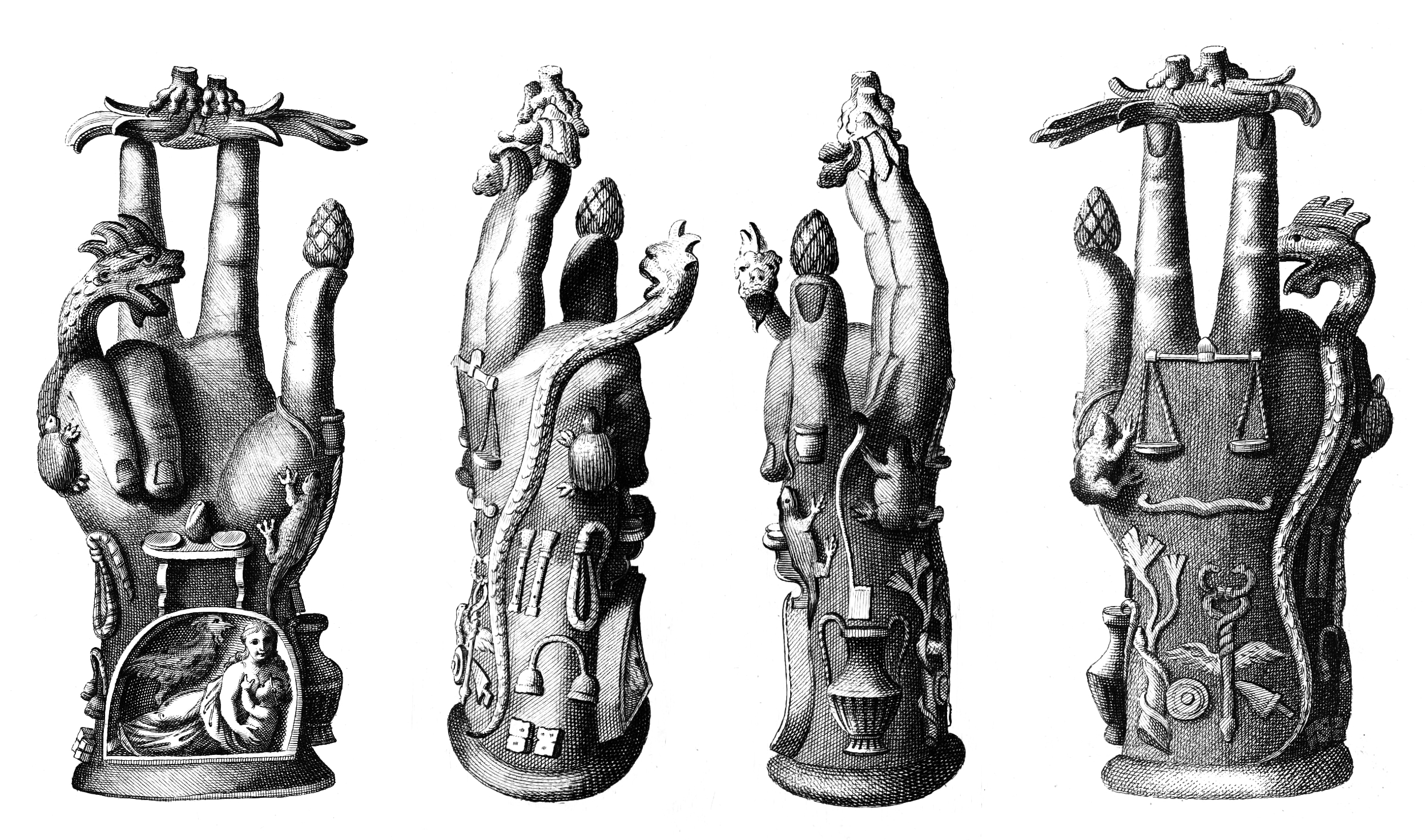
View from various angles.

Among Roman inscriptions from Nicopolis ad Istrum, Sabazios is generally equated with Jove and mentioned alongside Mercury. Similarly in Hellenistic monuments, Sabazios is either explicitly (via inscriptions) or implicitly (via iconography) associated with Zeus. On a marble slab from Philippopolis, Sabazios is depicted as a curly-haired and bearded central deity among several gods and goddesses. Under his left foot is a ram's head, and he holds in his left hand a sceptre tipped with a hand in the benedictio latina gesture. Sabazios is accompanied by busts on his right depicting Luna, Pan, and Mercury, and on his left by Sol, Fortuna, and Daphne. According to Macrobius, Liber and Helios were worshipped among the Thracians as Sabazios; this description fits other Classical accounts that identify Sabazios with Dionysos. Sabazios is also associated with a number of archeological finds depicting a bronze, right hand in the benedictio latina gesture. The hand appears to have had ritual significance and may have been affixed to a sceptre (as the one carried by Sabazios on the Philippopolis slab). Although there are many variations, the hand of Sabazios is typically depicted with a pinecone on the thumb and with a serpent or pair of serpents encircling the wrist and surmounting the bent ring and pinky fingers. Additional symbols occasionally included on the hands of Sabazios include a lightning bolt over the index and middle fingers, a turtle and lizard on the back of the hand, an eagle, a ram, a leafless branch, the thyrsos, and the Mounted Heros.

== Sabazios in Athens ==
The ecstatic Eastern rites practiced largely by women in Athens were thrown together for rhetorical purposes by Demosthenes in undermining his opponent Aeschines for participating in his mother's cultic associations:

On attaining manhood you abetted your mother in her initiations and the other rituals, and read aloud from the cultic writings ... You rubbed the fat-cheeked snakes and swung them above your head, crying Euoi saboi and hues attes, attes hues.

== Transformation to Sabazius ==
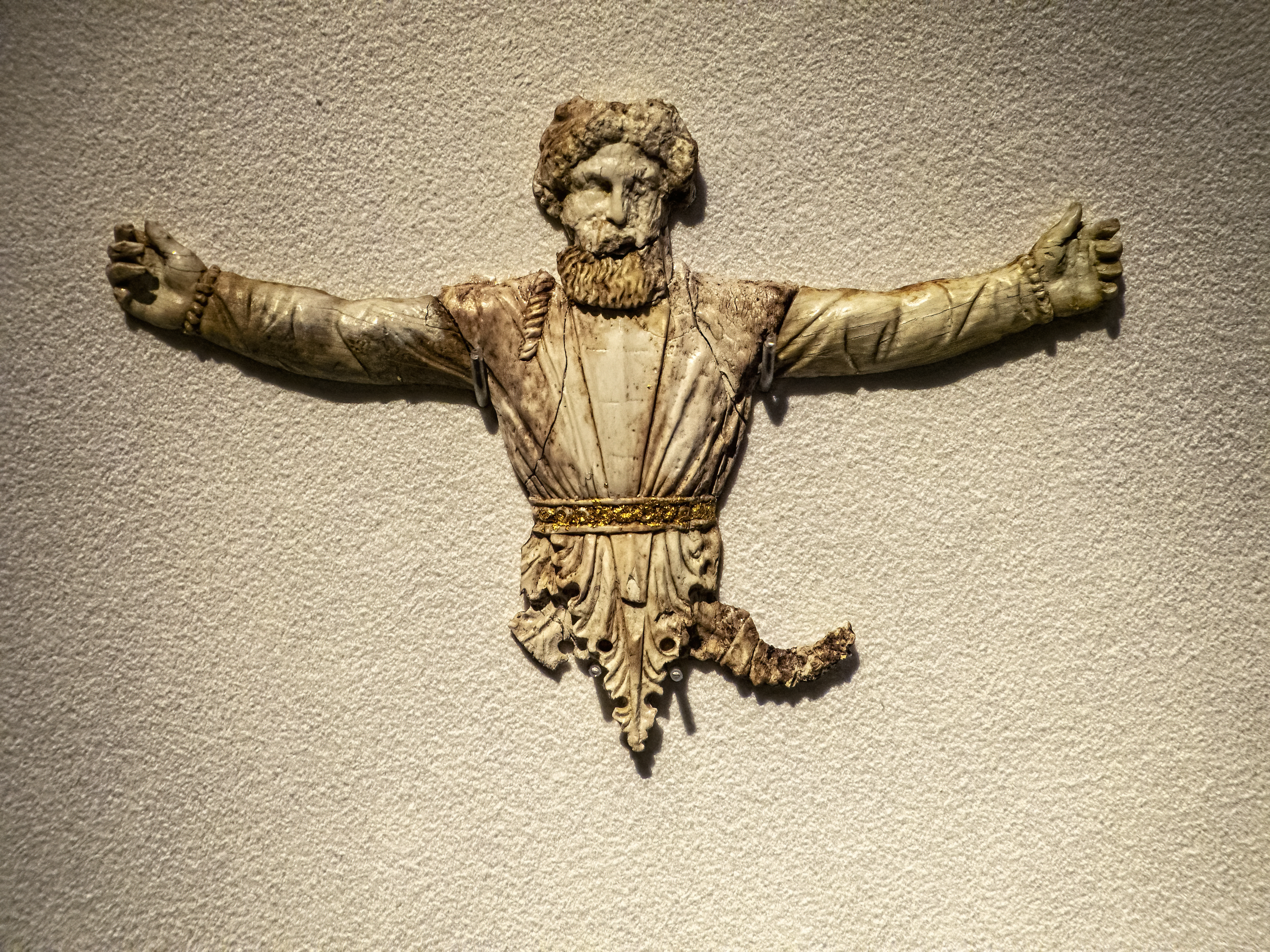
Ivory figurine of Sabazios from the tomb of Alexander IV of Macedon, Museum of the Royal Tombs of Aegae.

Transference of Sabazios to the Roman world appears to have been mediated in large part through Pergamum. The naturally syncretic approach of Greek religion blurred distinctions. Later Greek writers, like Strabo in the first century CE, linked Sabazios with Zagreus, among Phrygian ministers and attendants of the sacred rites of Rhea and Dionysos. Strabo's Sicilian contemporary, Diodorus Siculus, conflated Sabazios with the secret 'second' Dionysus, born of Zeus and Persephone, a connection that is not borne out by surviving inscriptions, which are entirely to Zeus Sabazios. The Christian Clement of Alexandria had been informed that the secret mysteries of Sabazius, as practiced among the Romans, involved a serpent, a chthonic creature unconnected with the mounted skygod of Phrygia: "'God in the bosom' is a countersign of the mysteries of Sabazius to the adepts". Clement reports: "This is a snake, passed through the bosom of the initiates".

Much later, the Byzantine Greek encyclopedia, Suda (c. 10th century), flatly states

Sabazios ... is the same as Dionysos. He acquired this form of address from the rite pertaining to him; for the barbarians call the bacchic cry "sabazein". Hence some of the Greeks too follow suit and call the cry "sabasmos"; thereby Dionysos [becomes] Sabazios. They also used to call "saboi" those places that had been dedicated to him and his Bacchantes ... Demosthenes [in the speech] "On Behalf of Ktesiphon" [mentions them]. Some say that Saboi is the term for those who are dedicated to Sabazios, that is to Dionysos, just as those [dedicated] to Bakkhos [are] Bakkhoi. They say that Sabazios and Dionysos are the same. Thus some also say that the Greeks call the Bakkhoi Saboi.

In Roman sites, though an inscription built into the wall of the abbey church of San Venanzio at Ceperana suggested to a Renaissance humanist it had been built upon the foundations of a temple to Jupiter Sabazius, according to modern scholars not a single temple consecrated to Sabazius, the rider god of the open air, has been located. Small votive hands, typically made of copper or bronze, are often associated with the cult of Sabazios. Many of these hands have a small perforation at the base which suggests they may have been attached to wooden poles and carried in processions. The symbolism of these objects is not well known.

== Judean connection ==
The first Jews who settled in Rome were expelled in 139 BCE, along with Chaldaean astrologers, by Cornelius Hispalus under a law which proscribed the propagation of the "corrupting" cult of "Jupiter Sabazius", according to the epitome of a lost book of Valerius Maximus:

Gnaeus Cornelius Hispalus, praetor peregrinus in the year of the consulate of Marcus Popilius Laenas and Lucius Calpurnius, ordered the astrologers by an edict to leave Rome and Italy within ten days, since by a fallacious interpretation of the stars they perturbed fickle and silly minds, thereby making profit out of their lies. The same praetor compelled the Judeans, who attempted to infect the Roman custom with the cult of Jupiter Sabazius, to return to their homes.

By this it is conjectured that the Romans identified the Judean YHVH Tzevaot ("sa-ba-oth", "of the Hosts") as Jove Sabazius.

This possibly mistaken connection of Sabazios and Sabaot was often repeated. In a similar vein, Plutarch maintained that the Judeans worshipped Dionysus, and that the day of Sabbath was a festival of Sabazius. Plutarch also discusses the identification of the Judean God with the "Egyptian" Typhon, an identification which he later rejects, however. The monotheistic Hypsistarians worshipped the Most High under this name, which may have been a form of the Jewish God.
