= Pythius =

5th century BC king of Lydia

Pythius (Ancient Greek: Πύθιος) is a Lydian king mentioned in Book VII of Herodotus' Histories, chapters 27–29 and 38–39. He is the son of Atys, and the grandson of Croesus, the last native king of Lydia before the Persian conquest.

The Persian king Xerxes I, son of Darius I, encounters Pythius, the second most wealthy person after Xerxes, on his way to invade Greece c. 480 BC. Pythius had grown wealthy through his gold mines in Celaenae, Phrygia. He met the Persian king in Celaenae and entertains him before offering to provide money for the expenses of war. This Xerxes politely declines, and instead rewards Pythius' generosity by giving him 7000 gold darics in order that his fortune might be an even 4,000,000 (ch. 29). His five sons accompanied Xerxes.

Later Pythius, emboldened by Xerxes' gift and alarmed at an eclipse of the sun, asks Xerxes to release his eldest son from the army, in order to care for him in his old age, while letting Xerxes retain the other four. Xerxes grows angry, citing his own sacrifice of family members without exception and calling Pythius his slave. Since he has promised to grant the wish, however, he takes the son, cuts him in half and marches his army away between the two halves, put up on either side of the road (ch. 39).
