= Adrastus (son of Gordias) =

Character in Greek mythology

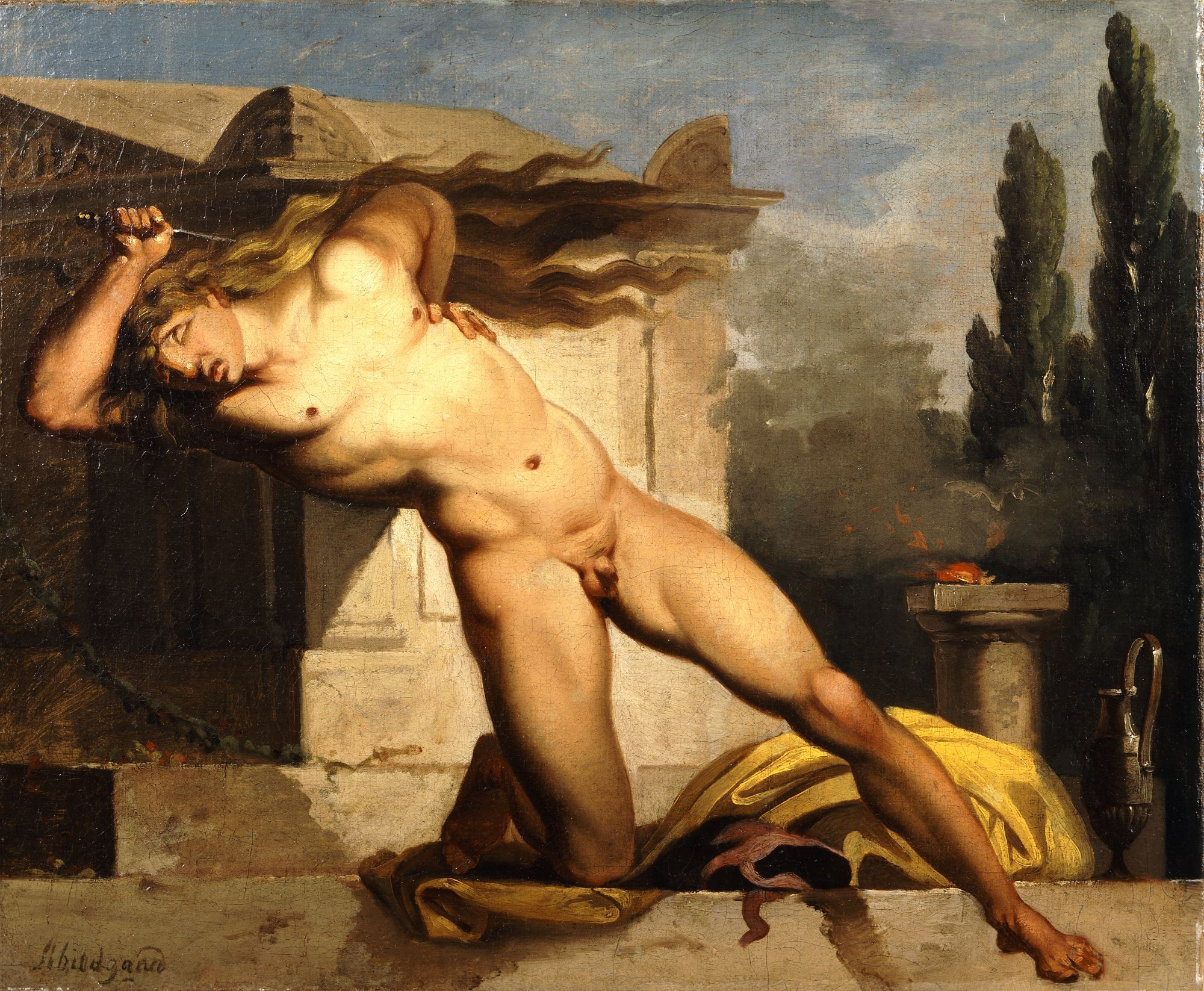
Adrastos slays himself on Atys' tomb (1776)

Adrastus (Greek: Ἄδραστος; Ionic: Adrestus Ἄδρηστος) was the son of Gordias, king of Phrygia. He features prominently in Herodotus's story of King Croesus of Lydia. Adrastus killed his brother, unwittingly, and was driven out by his father. In Sardis, he obtained purification (catharsis) from Croesus and was accepted as a guest in the palace.

During this time, a great boar came down from the Mysian Mount Olympus (a different mountain from the legendary home of the gods), which ravaged the lands of the Mysians; when they came out against it, they could inflict no harm upon it, but they suffered greatly in return. The Mysians sent messengers to the house of Croesus asking the king to send his son Atys with a party of men and dogs to aid them. Croesus initially refused to send his son, having had a dream warning of Atys's young death upon an iron spearpoint, but Atys succeeded in convincing him to let him go, making the point that no boar could wield an iron spear.

Croesus came to Adrastus to ask him for a favour, asking that he guard and protect his son on the hunt, and Adrastus accepted and accompanied Atys there. Upon finding the boar, the party surrounded it in a circle and hurled spears at it; however, Adrastus missed his target and struck Atys a mortal blow. When the group came back bearing Atys's body, Adrastus held his hands out to King Croesus in supplication – he begged that he be ritually slaughtered over the prince's body, saying that he could no longer go on living with the blood-guilt of yet another person on his hands. Croesus refused him this, saying this was vengeance from the gods, not Adrastus's personal fault; nevertheless, Adrastus killed himself.
