= AŞTİ =

Largest bus terminal in Ankara, Turkey

AŞTİ Ankara Şehirlerarası Otobüs Terminali
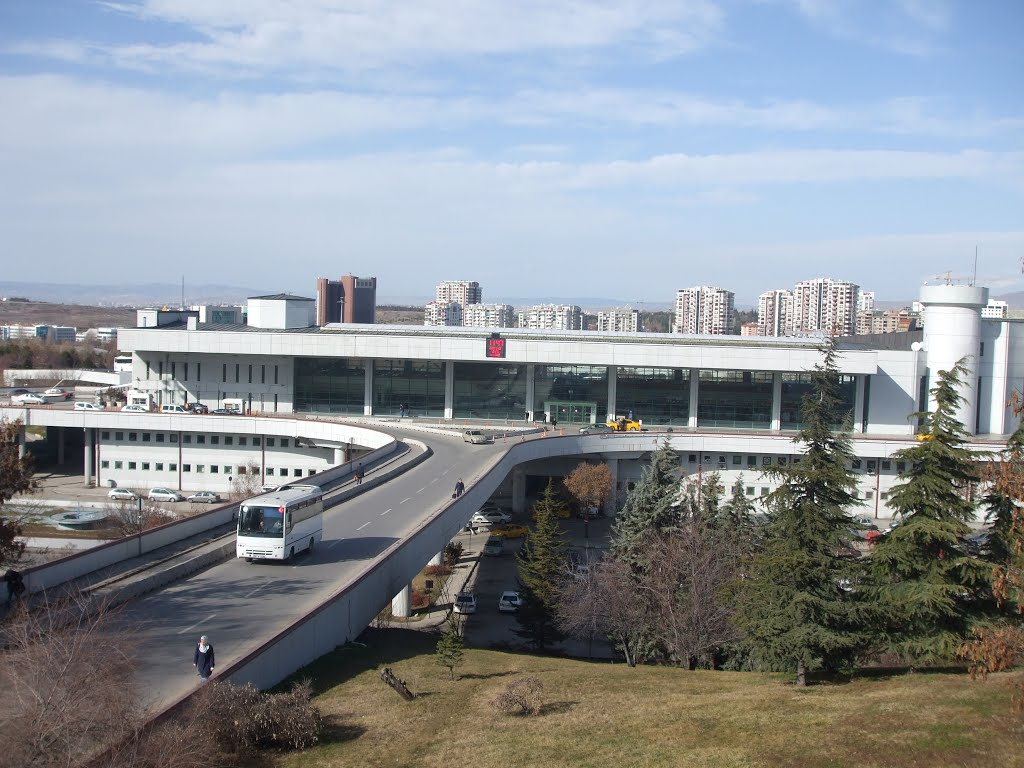
- AŞTİ Bus Station in Ankara

General information
- Location: Yenimahalle, Ankara
- Coordinates: 39.918278°N 32.810694°E
- Line: Intercity coaches
- Connections: Ankaray, city buses

Construction
- Parking: Yes
- Accessible: Yes

Other information
- Status: Operational

History
- Opened: 1995
Location
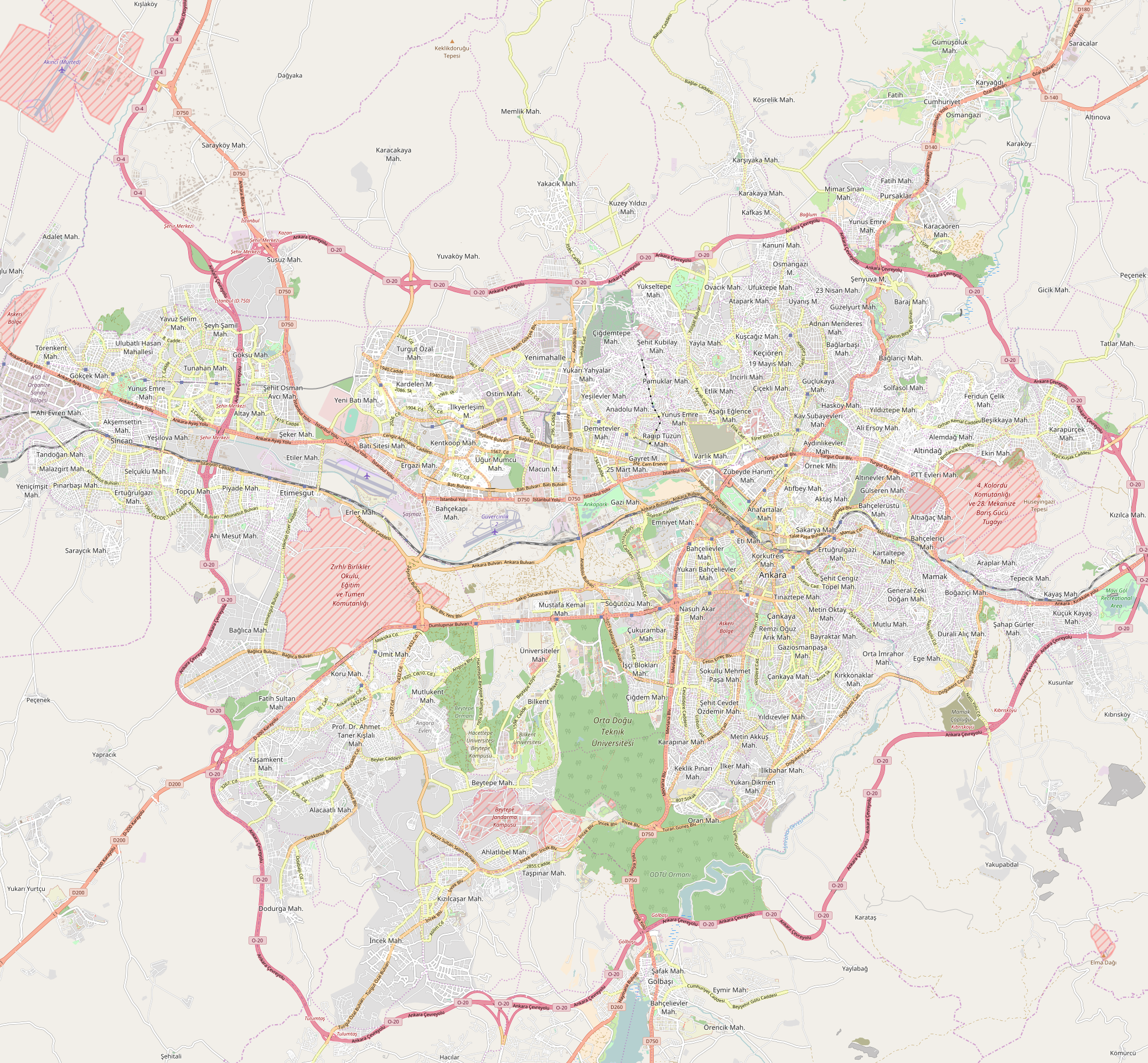
- Location within Ankara Location within Turkey

AŞTİ (Ankara Intercity Coach Terminal, Turkish: Ankara Şehirlerarası Otobüs Terminali) is the intercity bus terminal of Ankara, Turkey.

== Geography ==
AŞTİ is situated to the west of Mevlana Boulevard, the former Ankara ring road at 39°55′05″N 32°48′44″E . Its address is Beştepeler Mahallesı, Mevlana Bulvarı, No:82 Söğütözü, Çankaya.

== The terminal ==
The terminal was put into service in 1997. Its closed area is 128,520 square metres (1,383,400 sq ft) . It is a two-storey terminal where the lower floor is reserved for incoming traffic and the upper floor is reserved for outgoing traffic. Daily traffic is about 2500 busses.

== Main roads from Ankara ==
Ankara is situated more or less at the center of Turkey. There are five main roads from Ankara.

Boulevards and highways	Direction	Examples of target cities
Ondokuz Mayıs Boulevard- D.200 (east side)	East and Northeast Turkey	Samsun, Sivas, Erzurum, Trabzon
İrfan Baştuğ Boulevard- D.140	North Turkey	Çankırı, Kastamonu, Sinop
Fatih Sultan Mehmet Boulevard – D.750 (north side )	Northwest Turkey	Istanbul, Zonguldak, Bolu
İsmet İnönü Boulevard- D.200 (west side)	West Turkey	Eskişehir, İzmir, Bursa, Antalya
Mevlana Boulevard - D.750- (south side)	South Turkey	Konya, Kayseri, Mersin, Adana, Gaziantep

== See also ==
- List of highways in Turkey
