= Kartaltepe =

Kartaltepe (Turkish for 'Eagle Hill') may refer to:

== Places ==
- Kartaltepe, Bakırköy, a neighborhood in Istanbul Province, Turkey
- Kartaltepe, Bala, a neighborhood in Ankara Province, Turkey
- Kartaltepe, Bayrampaşa, a neighborhood in Istanbul Province, Turkey
- Kartaltepe, Küçükçekmece, a neighborhood in Istanbul Province, Turkey
- Kartaltepe, Mamak, a neighborhood in Ankara Province, Turkey
- Kartaltepe, Polatlı, a rural area in Ankara Province, Turkey
  - Mehmetçik Monument, or Kartaltepe Monument, a sculpture in Kartaltepe, Polatlı
- Kartaltepe, Sur, a neighborhood in Diyarbakır Province, Turkey
- Kartaltepe, the highest peak of Mount Uludağ in Bursa Province, Turkey

== People ==
- Cengizhan Kartaltepe (born 1973), Turkish volleyball player
- Jeyhan Kartaltepe, American astronomer
- Nilay Kartaltepe (born 1979), Turkish basketball player
