= List of highways numbered 88 =

The following highways have been numbered 88:

== International ==
- AH88 Asian Highway 88

== Australia ==
- Picton Road, New South Wales

== Canada ==
- Alberta Highway 88
- Ontario Highway 88 (former)

== France ==
- A88 autoroute

== Greece ==
- EO88 road

== Korea, South ==
- National Route 88
- Gukjido 88

== New Zealand ==
- New Zealand State Highway 88

== United Kingdom ==
- A88 road, Scotland

== United States ==
- Interstate 88 (Illinois)
  - Interstate 88 (New York)
- Alabama State Route 88
  - County Route 88 (Lee County, Alabama)
- Arizona State Route 88
- Arkansas Highway 88
- California State Route 88
- Colorado State Highway 88
- Florida State Road 88 (pre-1945) (former)
- Georgia State Route 88
- Illinois Route 88 (former)
  - Illinois Route 88A (former)
- K-88 (Kansas highway)
- Kentucky Route 88
- Louisiana Highway 88
- Maine State Route 88
- Maryland Route 88
- Massachusetts Route 88
- M-88 (Michigan highway)
- Minnesota State Highway 88 (former)
  - County Road 88 (Hennepin County, Minnesota)
  - County Road 88 (Ramsey County, Minnesota)
- Missouri Route 88 (former)
  - Missouri Route 88 (1922) (former)
- Nebraska Highway 88
  - Nebraska Recreation Road 88B
- Nevada State Route 88
- New Hampshire Route 88
- New Jersey Route 88
- New Mexico State Road 88
- New York State Route 88
  - County Route 88 (Cattaraugus County, New York)
  - County Route 88 (Chautauqua County, New York)
  - County Route 88 (Dutchess County, New York)
  - County Route 88 (Monroe County, New York)
  - County Route 88 (Montgomery County, New York)
  - County Route 88 (Oneida County, New York)
  - County Route 88 (Orange County, New York)
  - County Route 88 (Saratoga County, New York)
  - County Route 88 (Steuben County, New York)
  - County Route 88 (Suffolk County, New York)
- North Carolina Highway 88
- Ohio State Route 88
- Oklahoma State Highway 88
- Pennsylvania Route 88
- South Carolina Highway 88
- Tennessee State Route 88
- Texas State Highway 88 (former)
  - Texas State Highway Loop 88 (proposed)
  - Texas State Highway Loop 88 (1939–1990) (former)
  - Farm to Market Road 88
  - Urban Road 88 (signed as Farm to Market Road 88)
- Utah State Route 88
- Virginia State Route 88 (former)
- West Virginia Route 88
- Wisconsin Highway 88

== See also ==
- A88

Preceded by 87	Lists of highways 88	Succeeded by 89
