= List of highways numbered 89 =

The following highways are numbered 89:

== Canada ==
- Manitoba Highway 89
- Highway 89 (Ontario)

== Greece ==
- EO89 road

== Israel ==
- Highway 89 (Israel)

== New Zealand ==
- The Crown Range Road (formerly State Highway 89)

== United States ==
- Interstate 89
  - Interstate 89 (North Carolina) (former proposal)
- U.S. Route 89
  - U.S. Route 89A
- Alabama State Route 89
  - County Route 89 (Lee County, Alabama)
- Arizona State Route 89
  - Arizona State Route 89A
  - Arizona State Route 89L (former)
- Arkansas Highway 89
- California State Route 89
- Colorado State Highway 89
- Connecticut Route 89
- Florida State Road 89
  - County Road 89 (Santa Rosa County, Florida)
- Georgia State Route 89
- Illinois Route 89
  - Illinois Route 89B (former)
  - Illinois Route 89C (former)
- Iowa Highway 89 (former)
- K-89 (Kansas highway)
- Kentucky Route 89
- Louisiana Highway 89
- Maine State Route 89
- Maryland Route 89 (former)
- M-89 (Michigan highway)
- Minnesota State Highway 89
  - County Road 89 (Ramsey County, Minnesota)
- Missouri Route 89
- Montana Highway 89
- Nebraska Highway 89
  - Nebraska Recreation Road 89B
- Nevada State Route 89 (former)
- County Route 89 (Bergen County, New Jersey)
- New Mexico State Road 89
- New York State Route 89
  - County Route 89 (Cattaraugus County, New York)
  - County Route 89 (Cayuga County, New York)
  - County Route 89 (Chautauqua County, New York)
  - County Route 89 (Dutchess County, New York)
  - County Route 89 (Montgomery County, New York)
  - County Route 89 (Oneida County, New York)
  - County Route 89 (Orange County, New York)
  - County Route 89 (Rockland County, New York)
  - County Route 89 (Steuben County, New York)
  - County Route 89 (Suffolk County, New York)
- North Carolina Highway 89
- North Dakota Highway 89
- Ohio State Route 89
- Oklahoma State Highway 89
- Pennsylvania Route 89
- South Dakota Highway 89
- Tennessee State Route 89
- Texas State Highway 89
  - Farm to Market Road 89
  - Urban Road 89 (signed as Farm to Market Road 89)
- Utah State Route 89 (former)
- Virginia State Route 89
- West Virginia Route 89 (former)
  - County Route 89 (Marshall County, West Virginia)
  - County Route 89 (Wetzel County, West Virginia)
- Wisconsin Highway 89
- Wyoming Highway 89

== See also ==
- List of highways numbered 89A
- A89

Preceded by 88	Lists of highways 89	Succeeded by 90
