= Hacıtuğrul, Polatlı =

Hacıtuğrul
- Neighbourhood
- Location in Turkey Hacıtuğrul (Turkey Central Anatolia)
- Coordinates: 39°44′N 32°12′E
- Country: Turkey
- Province: Ankara
- District: Polatlı
- Population (2022): 179
- Time zone: UTC+3 (TRT)

Hacıtuğrul is a neighbourhood in the municipality and district of Polatlı, Ankara Province, Turkey. Its population is 179 (2022).

== Archaeology ==
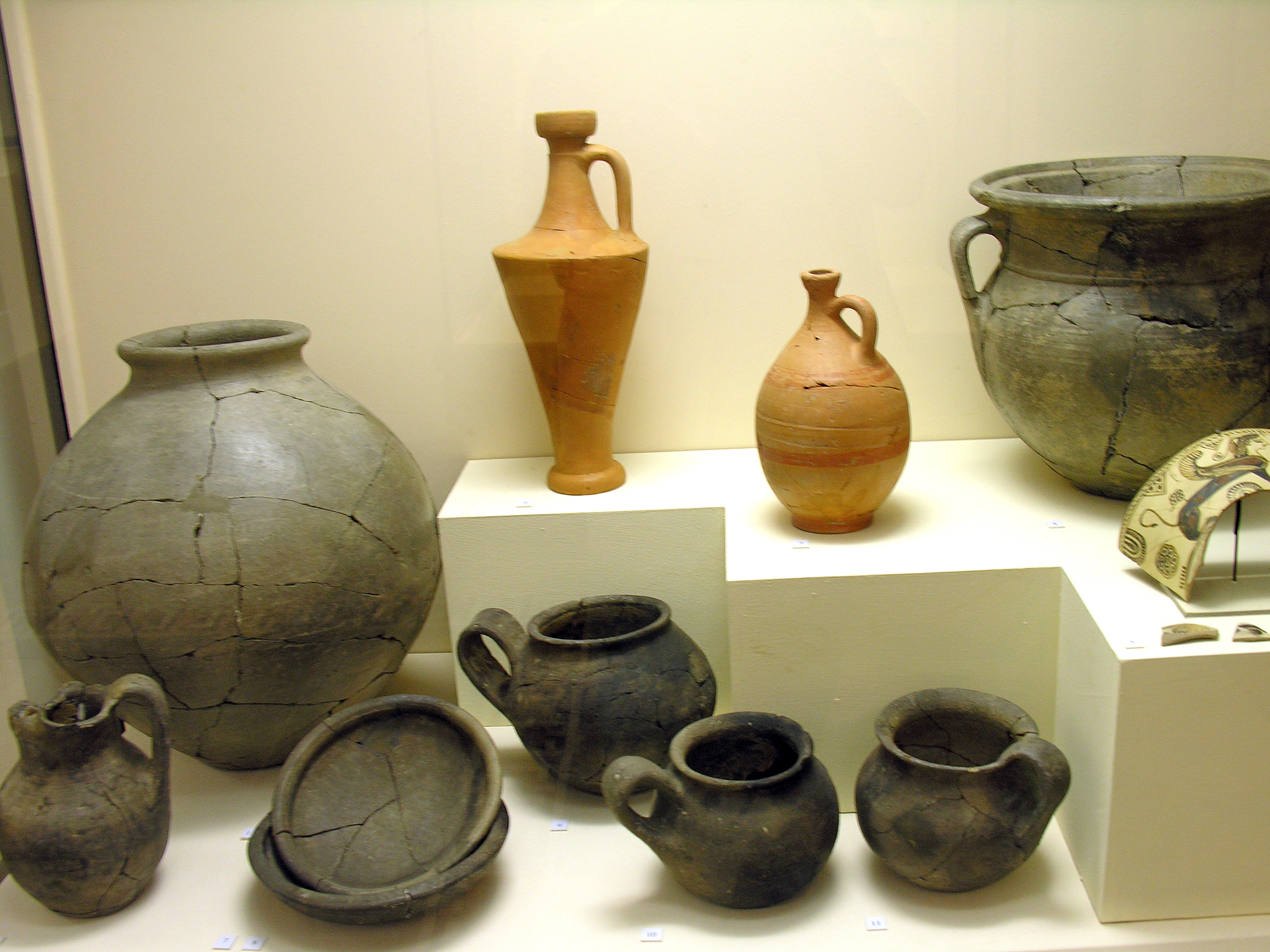
Pottery from Hacitugrul, 22 kilometers from Gordion. Gordion Museum

Hacıtuğrul Höyük (tr:Hacıtuğrul Höyüğü) is a mound located at the 60 km marker of the Ankara - Polatlı highway, between the village of Hacıtuğrul, and the Yenidoğan, Polatlı train station. Gordion is located 22 km to the northeast. In the older publications, the mound is referred to as Yenidogan Höyük or Külhöyük. The mound measures 650x600 meters, and is 24 meters high. With these dimensions, it is one of the largest mounds in Turkey, spread over an area of 3.3 hectares. It is roughly twice the size of Gordion.

Excavations show that the mound was a fortified Phrygian settlement. Based on the finds, it is contemporary with the new Phrygian fortress in Gordion, that is, it is dated to the 7th-6th century BC. It was most likely an extension of the Phrygian settlement in Gordion.

Excavations were carried out by the Museum of Anatolian Civilizations between 1972-79 under the direction of Burhan Tezcan. Layers belonging to the Hittite, Phrygian and Persian Periods have been identified.

== Literature ==
- C. Brian Rose, The Archaeology of Phrygian Gordion, Royal City of Midas: Gordion Special Studies 7, University of Pennsylvania Press, 2013, p. 205, 208
- Baptiste Vergnaud, A Phrygian Identity in Fortifications?, in: Soma 2012, Identity and Connectivity Proceedings of the 16th Symposium on Mediterranean Archaeology, Florence, Italy, 1–3 March 2012, BAR international series, 2581. Oxford, Archaeopress, 2013, p. 233-241
