= SR-89 =

SR 89 or Sr-89 may refer to:

- Strontium-89, a radioactive isotope of strontium
- State Route 89, a state highway numbered 89
