= List of highways numbered 87 Business =

Route 87 Business or Highway 87 Business may refer to:

- U.S. Route 87 Business
- Georgia State Route 87 Business
- North Carolina Highway 87 Business

== See also ==
- List of highways numbered 87
- List of highways numbered 87 Bypass
