= List of highways numbered 87 Bypass =

Route 87 Business or Highway 87 Business may refer to:

- U.S. Route 87 Bypass
- North Carolina Highway 87 Bypass

== See also ==
- List of highways numbered 87
- List of highways numbered 87 Business
