= Gures =

Gures may refer to:

- Gurez, a region in Kashmir
- Güreş, Polatlı, a village in Ankara Province, Turkey
- Güreş, a Turkish surname
  - Doğan Güreş (1926–2014), Turkish general and politician
  - Nihal Güres (born 1962), Turkish artists
  - Nilbar Güreş (born 1977), Turkish artist based in Austria

== See also ==
- Gurez
