= Basrı, Polatlı =

Basrı
- Neighbourhood
- Location in Turkey Basrı (Turkey Central Anatolia)
- Coordinates: 39°36′34″N 32°07′25″E
- Country: Turkey
- Province: Ankara
- District: Polatlı
- Population (2022): 2,082
- Time zone: UTC+3 (TRT)

Basrı is a neighbourhood in the municipality and district of Polatlı, Ankara Province, Turkey. Its population is 2,082 (2022).
