= Beyceğiz, Polatlı =

Beyceğiz
- Neighbourhood
- Location in Turkey Beyceğiz (Turkey Central Anatolia)
- Coordinates: 39°39′N 32°10′E
- Country: Turkey
- Province: Ankara
- District: Polatlı
- Population (2022): 197
- Time zone: UTC+3 (TRT)

Beyceğiz is a neighbourhood in the municipality and district of Polatlı, Ankara Province, Turkey. Its population is 197 (2022).
