= Çekirdeksiz, Polatlı =

Çekirdeksiz
- Neighbourhood
- Location in Turkey Çekirdeksiz (Turkey Central Anatolia)
- Coordinates: 39°37′N 32°03′E
- Country: Turkey
- Province: Ankara
- District: Polatlı
- Population (2022): 179
- Time zone: UTC+3 (TRT)

Çekirdeksiz is a neighbourhood in the municipality and district of Polatlı, Ankara Province, Turkey. Its population is 179 (2022).
