= Karaahmet, Polatlı =

Karaahmet
- Neighbourhood
- Location in Turkey Karaahmet (Turkey Central Anatolia)
- Coordinates: 39.8201°N 32.1582°E
- Country: Turkey
- Province: Ankara
- District: Polatlı
- Population (2022): 258
- Time zone: UTC+3 (TRT)

Karaahmet is a neighbourhood in the municipality and district of Polatlı, Ankara Province, Turkey. Its population is 258 (2022).
