= Yaralı, Polatlı =

Yaralı
- Neighbourhood
- Location in Turkey Yaralı (Turkey Central Anatolia)
- Coordinates: 39°17′N 32°04′E
- Country: Turkey
- Province: Ankara
- District: Polatlı
- Population (2022): 130
- Time zone: UTC+3 (TRT)

Yaralı is a neighbourhood in the municipality and district of Polatlı, Ankara Province, Turkey. Its population is 130 (2022).
