= Tatlıkuyu, Polatlı =

Tatlıkuyu
- Neighbourhood
- Location in Turkey Tatlıkuyu (Turkey Central Anatolia)
- Coordinates: 39.4631°N 32.0239°E
- Country: Turkey
- Province: Ankara
- District: Polatlı
- Population (2022): 171
- Time zone: UTC+3 (TRT)

Tatlıkuyu is a neighbourhood in the municipality and district of Polatlı, Ankara Province, Turkey. Its population is 171 (2022).
