= Hacımuslu, Polatlı =

Hacımuslu
- Neighbourhood
- Location in Turkey Hacımuslu (Turkey Central Anatolia)
- Coordinates: 39.3560°N 32.1797°E
- Country: Turkey
- Province: Ankara
- District: Polatlı
- Population (2022): 141
- Time zone: UTC+3 (TRT)

Hacımuslu is a neighbourhood in the municipality and district of Polatlı, Ankara Province, Turkey. Its population is 141 (2022). The village is populated by Kurds.
