= Taşpınar, Polatlı =

Taşpınar
- Neighbourhood
- Location in Turkey Taşpınar (Turkey Central Anatolia)
- Coordinates: 39.5693°N 32.3174°E
- Country: Turkey
- Province: Ankara
- District: Polatlı
- Population (2022): 94
- Time zone: UTC+3 (TRT)

Taşpınar is a neighbourhood in the municipality and district of Polatlı, Ankara Province, Turkey. Its population is 94 (2022).
