= Üçpınar, Polatlı =

Üçpınar
- Neighbourhood
- Location in Turkey Üçpınar (Turkey Central Anatolia)
- Coordinates: 39.5808°N 32.0829°E
- Country: Turkey
- Province: Ankara
- District: Polatlı
- Population (2022): 174
- Time zone: UTC+3 (TRT)

Üçpınar is a neighbourhood in the municipality and district of Polatlı, Ankara Province, Turkey. Its population is 174 (2022).
