= Özyurt, Polatlı =

Özyurt
- Neighbourhood
- Location in Turkey Özyurt (Turkey Central Anatolia)
- Coordinates: 39.2119°N 32.0654°E
- Country: Turkey
- Province: Ankara
- District: Polatlı
- Population (2022): 227
- Time zone: UTC+3 (TRT)

Özyurt is a neighbourhood in the municipality and district of Polatlı, Ankara Province, Turkey. Its population is 227 (2022). The village is populated by Kurds.
