= İsmet İnönü Boulevard (Ankara) =

Boulevard in Ankara

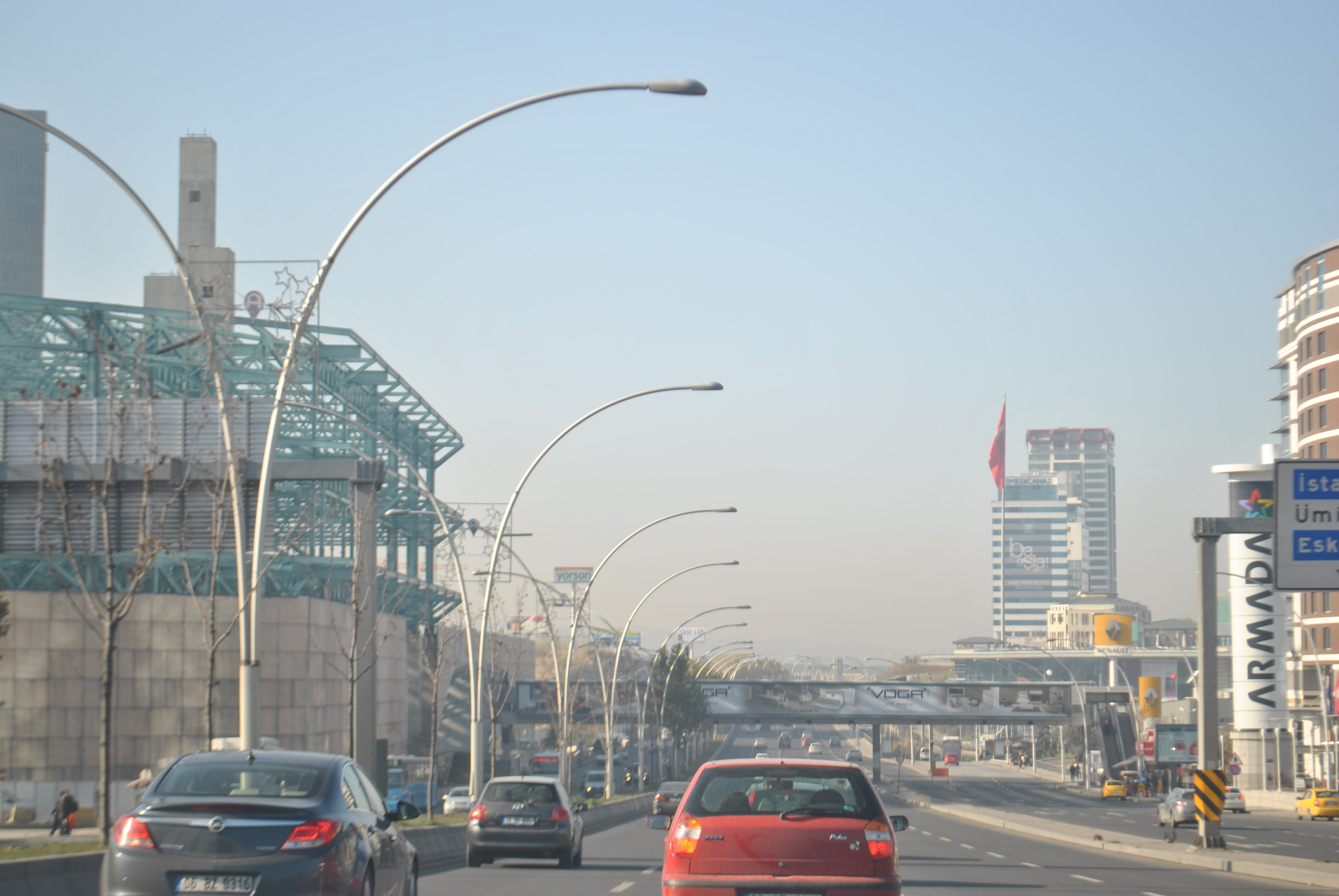
the west end of ismet İnönü Boulevard

İsmet İnönü Boulevard is a busy boulevard in Ankara, Turkey. The boulevard is named after İsmet İnönü, the second president of Turkey and one of the pioneers of the Turkish War of Independence.

== Geography ==
The easternmost point of the boulevard is at 39°54′48″N 32°51′16″E where it intersects Atatürk Boulevard. The westernmost point is at 39°54′46″N 32°48′52″E where it intersects Mevlana Boulevard and fuses to D.200 , the Turkish state highway which connects Ankara to western Anatolia. Between these two points the length of the boulevard is about 6 kilometres (3.7 mi).

== Main Buildings ==
Ankara being the capital of Turkey, has many governmental offices most of which are around İsmet İnönü Boulevard. For example, Grand National Assembly of Turkey, Ministry of Energy and Natural Sources, Ministry of Foreign Affairs, Turkish Court of Accounts, are at the south side of the boulevard. Ministry of Interior, Ministry of Economy, General Directorate of Highways, State Hydraulic Works, Turkish Statistical Institute and National Library of Turkey are at the north side.

== Traffic density ==
In addition to offices in the İsmet İnönü Boulevard there are also some universities such as Middle East Technical University and Bilkent University, some shopping malls, neighborhoods and newly established office buildings around D-200 further to west. Thus the traffic density on İsmet İnönü Boulevard is very high. To ease the traffic flow the municipality of Ankara established a series of four underpasses in the course. These underpasses are useful especially for the side street connections. Another recent facility is M2, a new line of Ankara Metro.
