= Şabanözü, Polatlı =

Şabanözü
- Neighbourhood
- Location in Turkey Şabanözü (Turkey Central Anatolia)
- Coordinates: 39.7278°N 32.0978°E
- Country: Turkey
- Province: Ankara
- District: Polatlı
- Population (2022): 485
- Time zone: UTC+3 (TRT)

Şabanözü is a neighbourhood in the municipality and district of Polatlı, Ankara Province, Turkey. Its population is 485 (2022).
