= Mevlana Boulevard =

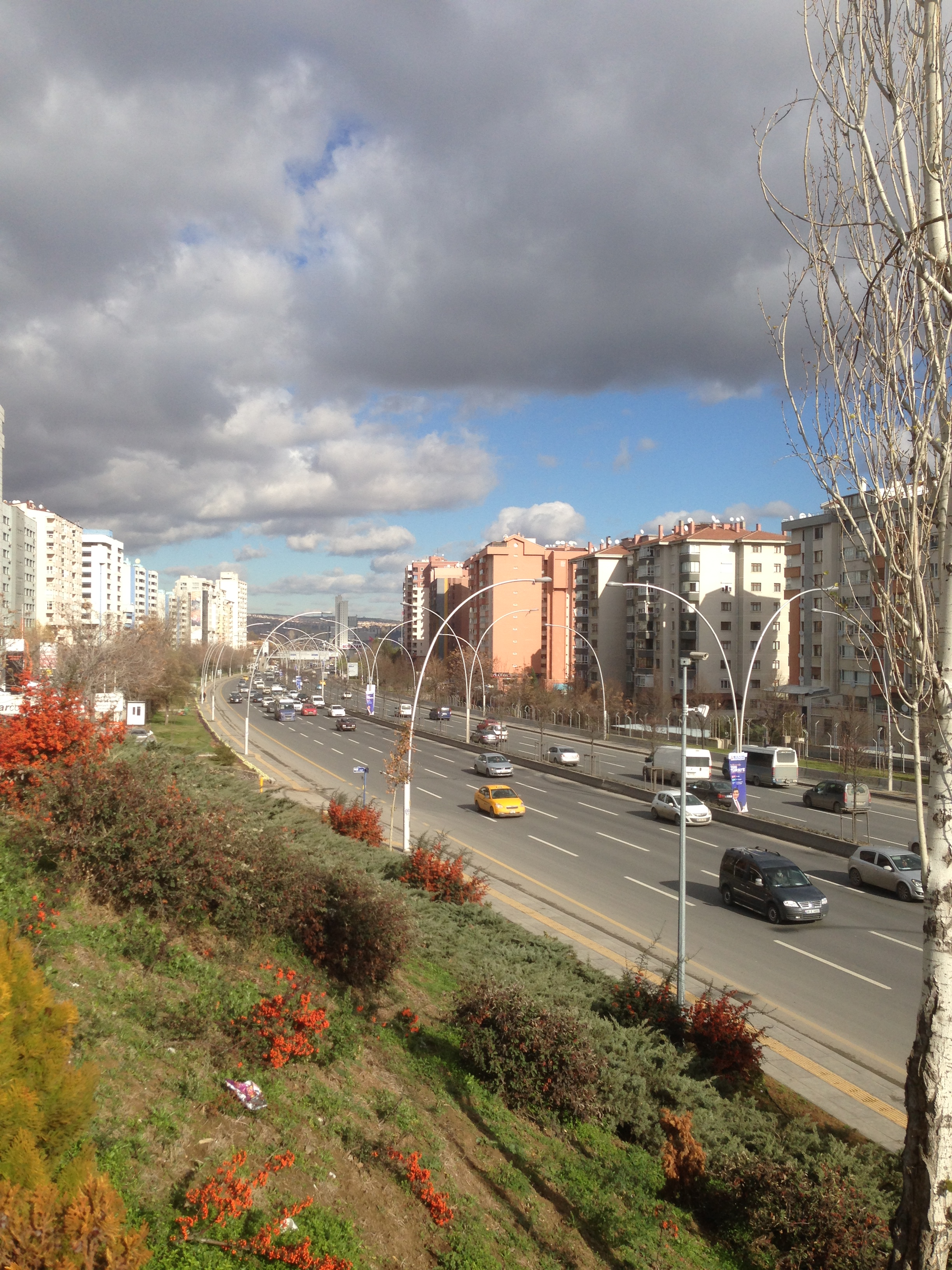

Mevlana Boulevard (also known as Konya Boulevard) is a boulevard in Ankara, Turkey. It is named after Mevlana, who is also known as Rumi, the Islamic scholar who spent most of his life in what is now Turkey in the 13th century.

== Geography ==
The boulevard was actually a part of the Ankara ring road before the construction of the motorway. The southernmost point of the boulevard is at 39°50′35″N 32°48′21″E where it fuses to D.750 the Turkish state highway which connects Ankara to South Turkey. The boulevard continues to North up to 39°57′04″N 32°50′08″E where it fuses to Turgut Özal Boulevard (which in turn fuses to D.200 which connects Ankara to the east and north Turkey.) Between these two points, the length of the boulevard is about 12.5 kilometres (7.8 mi).

== Main Buildings ==
There are two important intersections. One is the intersection with İsmet İnönü Boulevard which connects Ankara to the west and the other one, at the end of the course is Fatih Sultan Mehmet Boulevard which connects Ankara to northwest Turkey. Most of the buildings are situated to the east of the boulevard. But new quarters of Ankara are flourishing to the west. One of the most important buildings is the intercity bus terminal of Ankara (AŞTİ).
