= Gündoğan, Polatlı =

Gündoğan
- Neighbourhood
- Location in Turkey Gündoğan (Turkey Central Anatolia)
- Coordinates: 39.4872°N 32.2433°E
- Country: Turkey
- Province: Ankara
- District: Polatlı
- Population (2022): 92
- Time zone: UTC+3 (TRT)

Gündoğan is a neighbourhood in the municipality and district of Polatlı, Ankara Province, Turkey. Its population is 92 (2022).
