= Çimenceğiz, Polatlı =

Çimenceğiz
- Neighbourhood
- Location in Turkey Çimenceğiz (Turkey Central Anatolia)
- Coordinates: 39°41′N 32°09′E
- Country: Turkey
- Province: Ankara
- District: Polatlı
- Population (2022): 91
- Time zone: UTC+3 (TRT)

Çimenceğiz is a neighbourhood in the municipality and district of Polatlı, Ankara Province, Turkey. Its population is 91 (2022).
