= Gedikli, Polatlı =

Gedikli
- Neighbourhood
- Location in Turkey Gedikli (Turkey Central Anatolia)
- Coordinates: 39.7309°N 32.2300°E
- Country: Turkey
- Province: Ankara
- District: Polatlı
- Population (2022): 78
- Time zone: UTC+3 (TRT)

Gedikli is a neighbourhood in the municipality and district of Polatlı, Ankara Province, Turkey. Its population is 78 (2022).
