= Kuşcu, Polatlı =

Kuşcu
- Neighbourhood
- Location in Turkey Kuşcu (Turkey Central Anatolia)
- Coordinates: 39.6368°N 32.2818°E
- Country: Turkey
- Province: Ankara
- District: Polatlı
- Population (2022): 341
- Time zone: UTC+3 (TRT)

Kuşcu is a neighbourhood in the municipality and district of Polatlı, Ankara Province, Turkey. Its population is 341 (2022).
