= İğciler, Polatlı =

İğciler
- Neighbourhood
- Location in Turkey İğciler (Turkey Central Anatolia)
- Coordinates: 39°33′N 32°04′E
- Country: Turkey
- Province: Ankara
- District: Polatlı
- Population (2022): 484
- Time zone: UTC+3 (TRT)

İğciler is a neighbourhood in the municipality and district of Polatlı, Ankara Province, Turkey. Its population is 484 (2022).
