= Eskikarsak, Polatlı =

Eskikarsak
- Neighbourhood
- Location in Turkey Eskikarsak (Turkey Central Anatolia)
- Coordinates: 39°25′N 32°03′E
- Country: Turkey
- Province: Ankara
- District: Polatlı
- Population (2022): 150
- Time zone: UTC+3 (TRT)

Eskikarsak is a neighbourhood in the municipality and district of Polatlı, Ankara Province, Turkey. Its population is 150 (2022). The village is populated by Kurds.
