= Kocahacılı, Polatlı =

Kocahacılı
- Neighbourhood
- Location in Turkey Kocahacılı (Turkey Central Anatolia)
- Coordinates: 39.3079°N 32.0475°E
- Country: Turkey
- Province: Ankara
- District: Polatlı
- Population (2022): 84
- Time zone: UTC+3 (TRT)

Kocahacılı is a neighbourhood in the municipality and district of Polatlı, Ankara Province, Turkey. Its population is 84 (2022).
