= Sinanlı, Polatlı =

Sinanlı
- Neighbourhood
- Location in Turkey Sinanlı (Turkey Central Anatolia)
- Coordinates: 39.1161°N 32.0131°E
- Country: Turkey
- Province: Ankara
- District: Polatlı
- Population (2022): 95
- Time zone: UTC+3 (TRT)

Sinanlı is a neighbourhood in the municipality and district of Polatlı, Ankara Province, Turkey. Its population is 95 (2022). The village is populated by Kurds and Yörüks.
