= Hıdırşeyh, Polatlı =

Hıdırşeyh
- Neighbourhood
- Location in Turkey Hıdırşeyh (Turkey Central Anatolia)
- Coordinates: 39°50′21″N 32°14′13″E
- Country: Turkey
- Province: Ankara
- District: Polatlı
- Population (2022): 84
- Time zone: UTC+3 (TRT)

Hıdırşeyh is a neighbourhood in the municipality and district of Polatlı, Ankara Province, Turkey. Its population is 84 (2022).
