= Karakaya, Polatlı =

Karakaya
- Neighbourhood
- Location in Turkey Karakaya (Turkey Central Anatolia)
- Coordinates: 39.5114°N 32.3661°E
- Country: Turkey
- Province: Ankara
- District: Polatlı
- Population (2022): 79
- Time zone: UTC+3 (TRT)

Karakaya is a neighbourhood in the municipality and district of Polatlı, Ankara Province, Turkey. Its population is 79 (2022).
