= Toydemir, Polatlı =

Toydemir
- Neighbourhood
- Location in Turkey Toydemir (Turkey Central Anatolia)
- Coordinates: 39.3921°N 32.1769°E
- Country: Turkey
- Province: Ankara
- District: Polatlı
- Population (2022): 47
- Time zone: UTC+3 (TRT)

Toydemir is a neighbourhood in the municipality and district of Polatlı, Ankara Province, Turkey. Its population is 47 (2022).
