= Oğuzlar, Polatlı =

Oğuzlar
- Neighbourhood
- Location in Turkey Oğuzlar (Turkey Central Anatolia)
- Coordinates: 39.7921°N 32.0955°E
- Country: Turkey
- Province: Ankara
- District: Polatlı
- Population (2022): 89
- Time zone: UTC+3 (TRT)

Oğuzlar is a neighbourhood in the municipality and district of Polatlı, Ankara Province, Turkey. Its population is 89 (2022).
