= Yağcıoğlu, Polatlı =

Yağcıoğlu
- Neighbourhood
- Location in Turkey Yağcıoğlu (Turkey Central Anatolia)
- Coordinates: 39°04′N 32°13′E
- Country: Turkey
- Province: Ankara
- District: Polatlı
- Population (2022): 196
- Time zone: UTC+3 (TRT)

Yağcıoğlu is a neighbourhood in the municipality and district of Polatlı, Ankara Province, Turkey. Its population is 196 (2022).
