= List of highways numbered 87 =

The following highways are numbered 87:

== International ==
- AH87 Asian Highway 87
- E87 European route E87

== Australia ==
- Stuart Highway (A87, or Highway A87)
- Kidman Way (New South Wales)

== Greece ==
- EO87 road

== India ==
- National Highway 87 (India)
- State Highway 87 (Karnataka)

== Iran ==
- Road 87

== Ireland ==
- N87 road (Ireland)

== Israel ==
- Highway 87 (Israel)

== Korea, South ==
- National Route 87

== New Zealand ==
- New Zealand State Highway 87

== United States ==
- Interstate 87 (New York)
  - Interstate 87 (North Carolina)
- U.S. Route 87
- Alabama State Route 87
- Arizona State Route 87
- Arkansas Highway 87
- California State Route 87
- Connecticut Route 87
- Florida State Road 87
  - County Road 87A (Santa Rosa County, Florida)
- Georgia State Route 87
- Idaho State Highway 87
- Illinois Route 87 (former)
- K-87 (Kansas highway)
- Kentucky Route 87
- Louisiana Highway 87
- Maryland Route 87 (former)
- M-87 (Michigan highway) (former)
- Minnesota State Highway 87
- Missouri Route 87
- Montana Highway 87
- Nebraska Highway 87
- New Hampshire Route 87
- New Jersey Route 87
  - County Route 87 (Bergen County, New Jersey)
- New York State Route 87 (former)
  - County Route 87 (Chautauqua County, New York)
  - County Route 87 (Dutchess County, New York)
  - County Route 87 (Erie County, New York)
  - County Route 87 (Jefferson County, New York)
  - County Route 87 (Monroe County, New York)
  - County Route 87 (Orleans County, New York)
  - County Route 87 (Steuben County, New York)
  - County Route 87 (Suffolk County, New York)
  - County Route 87 (Westchester County, New York)
- North Carolina Highway 87
- Ohio State Route 87
- Oklahoma State Highway 87
- Pennsylvania Route 87
- South Dakota Highway 87
- Tennessee State Route 87
- Texas State Highway 87
  - Texas State Highway Spur 87
  - Farm to Market Road 87
  - Ranch to Market Road 87 (former)
- Utah State Route 87
- Virginia State Route 87
- West Virginia Route 87
- Wisconsin Highway 87
- Wyoming Highway 87

== See also ==
- A87

Preceded by 86	Lists of highways 87	Succeeded by 88
