= Kayabaşı, Polatlı =

Kayabaşı
- Neighbourhood
- Location in Turkey Kayabaşı (Turkey Central Anatolia)
- Coordinates: 39.5566°N 32.3599°E
- Country: Turkey
- Province: Ankara
- District: Polatlı
- Population (2022): 111
- Time zone: UTC+3 (TRT)

Kayabaşı is a neighbourhood in the municipality and district of Polatlı, Ankara Province, Turkey. Its population is 111 (2022). The village is populated by Kurds.
