= Mehmetçik Monument =

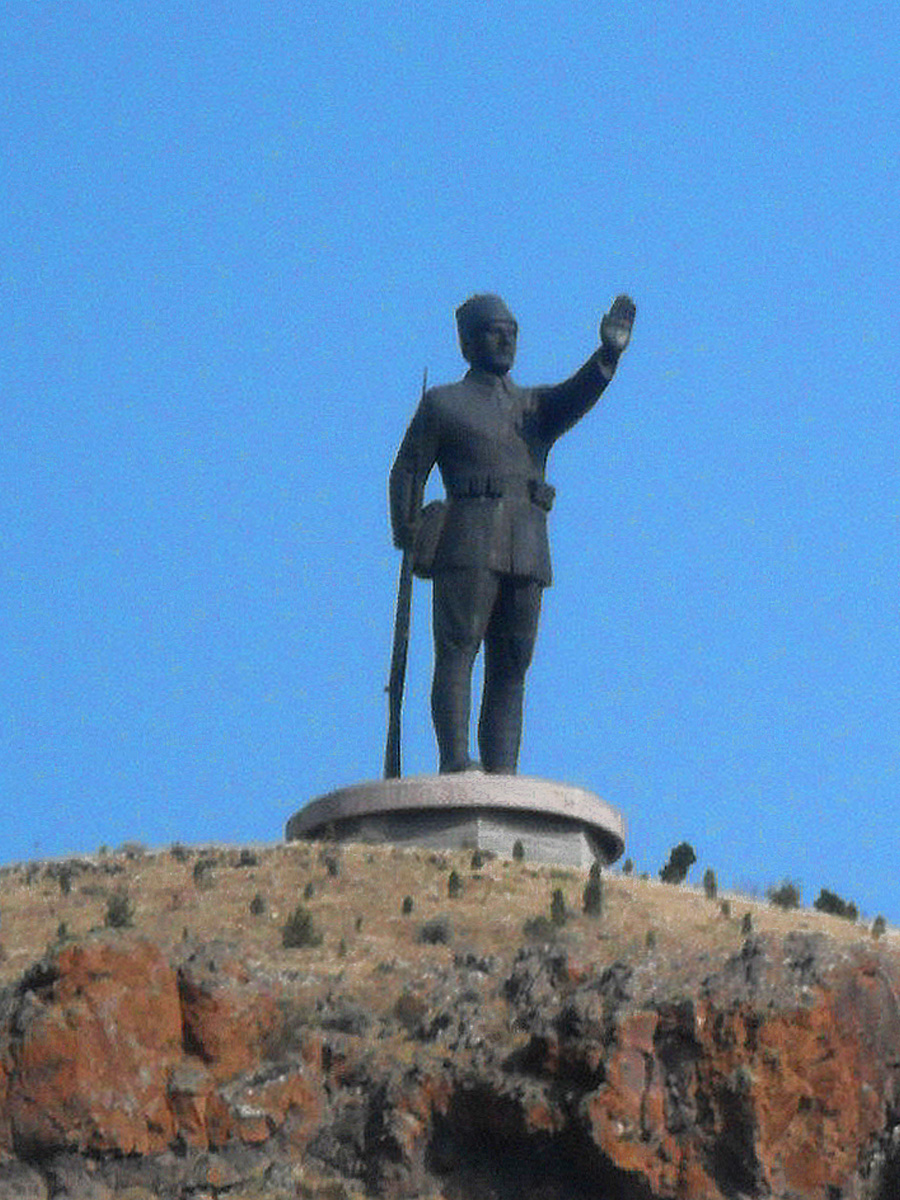
- Mehmetçik Monument on Kartaltepe, Polatlı.
- Interactive map of Mehmetçik Monument
- Location: close to Polatlı, Ankara Province, Turkey
- Coordinates: 39.5747°N 32.0605°E
- Designer: Sait Rüstem
- Material: Steel
- Height: 22 m (72 ft)
- Opening date: August 8, 2008; 17 years ago
- Dedicated to: Turkish soldiers

Mehmetçik Monument (Kartaltepe Mehmetçik Monument) is a monumental sculpture featuring a Turkish soldier on Kartaltepe of Polatlı, a rural area of Ankara Province, Turkey. The name of the monument Mehmetçik is the diminutive form of the common name Mehmet, which is used to nickname Turkish soldiers.

== Location ==
The sculpture is situated on top of the Kartaltepe hill just 6 km (3.7 mi) west of Polatlı and 75 km (47 mi) west of Ankara at 39°34′29″N 32°03′38″E. It is to the south of the Turkish state highway D.200, which connects west Anatolia to Ankara. Turkish high speed train railway route passes through a 470 metres (1,540 ft) tunnel under Kartaltepe. Gordion the historical capital of Phrygia is about 12 km (7.5 mi) to the north.

== History ==
The monument was sponsored by the Koç Holding and Tüpraş company. Binali Yıldırım, the Minister of Transport, Maritime and Communication, Yaşar Büyükanıt, the Chief of the Turkish General Staff, the sponsor Mustafa Koç as well as a group of MPs and the mayor of Polatlı were present in the opening ceremony on 6 August 2008. It is further planned to establish a museum about the Battle of Sakarya next to the monument.

== Monument ==
The Battle of Sakarya was one of the most important milestones in the Greco-Turkish War (1919-1922). During the 22–day battle, the Greek army advanced as far as Kartaltepe hill. But during the counterattack of the Turkish forces, the Greek offence was checked. This was a critical turning point. One year later, the Greek army fell back and last of the Greek forces withdrew from Anatolia. The monument was erected to commemorate the turning point of the Turkish War of Independence at this site.

The monument is actually a 22 m (72 ft) tall sculpture of a soldier in 1921–uniform with a rifle in the right hand and raising the left hand as a gesture to halt the Greek advance. It is placed on a 10 m (33 ft)-high base. It is created by Prof. Sait Rüstem and made of copper-coated concrete. It was constructed by TEKTA Eng. Consulting Cons. & Trade Ltd. Co.
