= Yenice, Polatlı =

Yenice
- Neighbourhood
- Country: Turkey
- Province: Ankara
- District: Polatlı
- Population (2022): 134
- Time zone: UTC+3 (TRT)

Yenice is a neighbourhood in the municipality and district of Polatlı, Ankara Province, Turkey. Its population is 134 (2022).
