= Gençali, Polatlı =

Gençali
- Neighbourhood
- Country: Turkey
- Province: Ankara
- District: Polatlı
- Population (2022): 165
- Time zone: UTC+3 (TRT)

Gençali is a neighbourhood in the municipality and district of Polatlı, Ankara Province, Turkey. Its population is 165 (2022).
