= Beylikköprü, Polatlı =

Beylikköprü
- Neighbourhood
- Location in Turkey Beylikköprü (Turkey Central Anatolia)
- Coordinates: 39°36′N 31°57′E
- Country: Turkey
- Province: Ankara
- District: Polatlı
- Population (2022): 943
- Time zone: UTC+3 (TRT)

Beylikköprü is a neighbourhood in the municipality and district of Polatlı, Ankara Province, Turkey. Its population is 943 (2022).
