= Eskiköseler, Polatlı =

Eskiköseler
- Neighbourhood
- Location in Turkey Eskiköseler (Turkey Central Anatolia)
- Coordinates: 39°36′N 32°21′E
- Country: Turkey
- Province: Ankara
- District: Polatlı
- Population (2022): 239
- Time zone: UTC+3 (TRT)

Eskiköseler is a neighbourhood in the municipality and district of Polatlı, Ankara Province, Turkey. Its population is 239 (2022).
