= Karapınar, Polatlı =

Karapınar
- Neighbourhood
- Location in Turkey Karapınar (Turkey Central Anatolia)
- Coordinates: 39°37′26″N 32°10′36″E
- Country: Turkey
- Province: Ankara
- District: Polatlı
- Population (2022): 400
- Time zone: UTC+3 (TRT)

Karapınar is a neighbourhood in the municipality and district of Polatlı, Ankara Province, Turkey. Its population is 400 (2022). The village is 4 km away from Polatlı town center and 69 km to Ankara.

The village is populated by Kurds and Tatars.
