= Gordion Museum =

Museum in Turkey

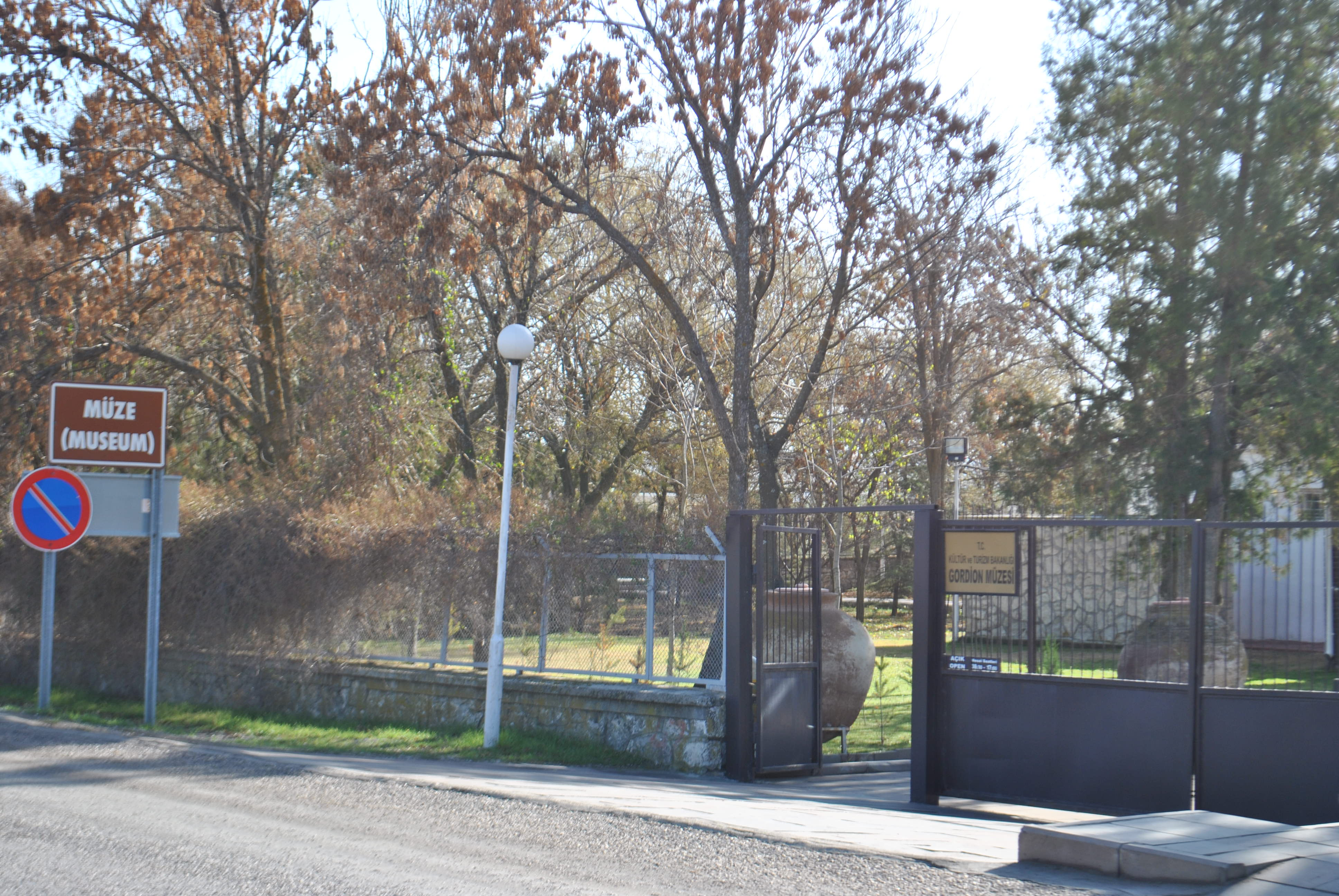
- Entrance

- Gordion Museum
- Established: 1963; 63 years ago
- Coordinates: 39°39′10″N 31°39′47″E
- Type: Archaeology
- Owner: Ministry of Culture

Gordion Museum is a museum in Turkey.

== Location ==
Unlike most other museums this museum is located in a village. It is in Yassıhöyük village of Polatlı ilçe (district) in Ankara Province on the road to Polatlı at 39°39′10″N 31°39′47″E. The village is founded next to Gordion, the capital of Phrygia an ancient kingdom in Anatolia.

== History ==
The museum was established in 1963 as a subsidiary of Museum of Anatolian Civilizations in Ankara about 75 kilometres (47 mi) away. Recently, the museum was enlarged by adding a 180 square metres (1,900 sq ft) stock room, a 150 square metres (1,600 sq ft) additional exhibition hall a lab and conference room. There is also a 5,000 square metres (54,000 sq ft) open air exhibition area.

== Exhibits ==
The exhibits include the Phrygian and other archaeological items, especially those of King Midas. There is also a chronological exhibition of later artifacts including Hellenistic and Roman Empire items and also a coinage section.

There are many tumuli around Gordion. They are actually the tombs of Phrygian aristocrats. The most important tumulus with a 300 metres (980 ft) diameter and 55 metres (180 ft) height belongs to King Midas. It was unearthed in 1957 and after underpinning works it was opened to visits.

== Gallery ==
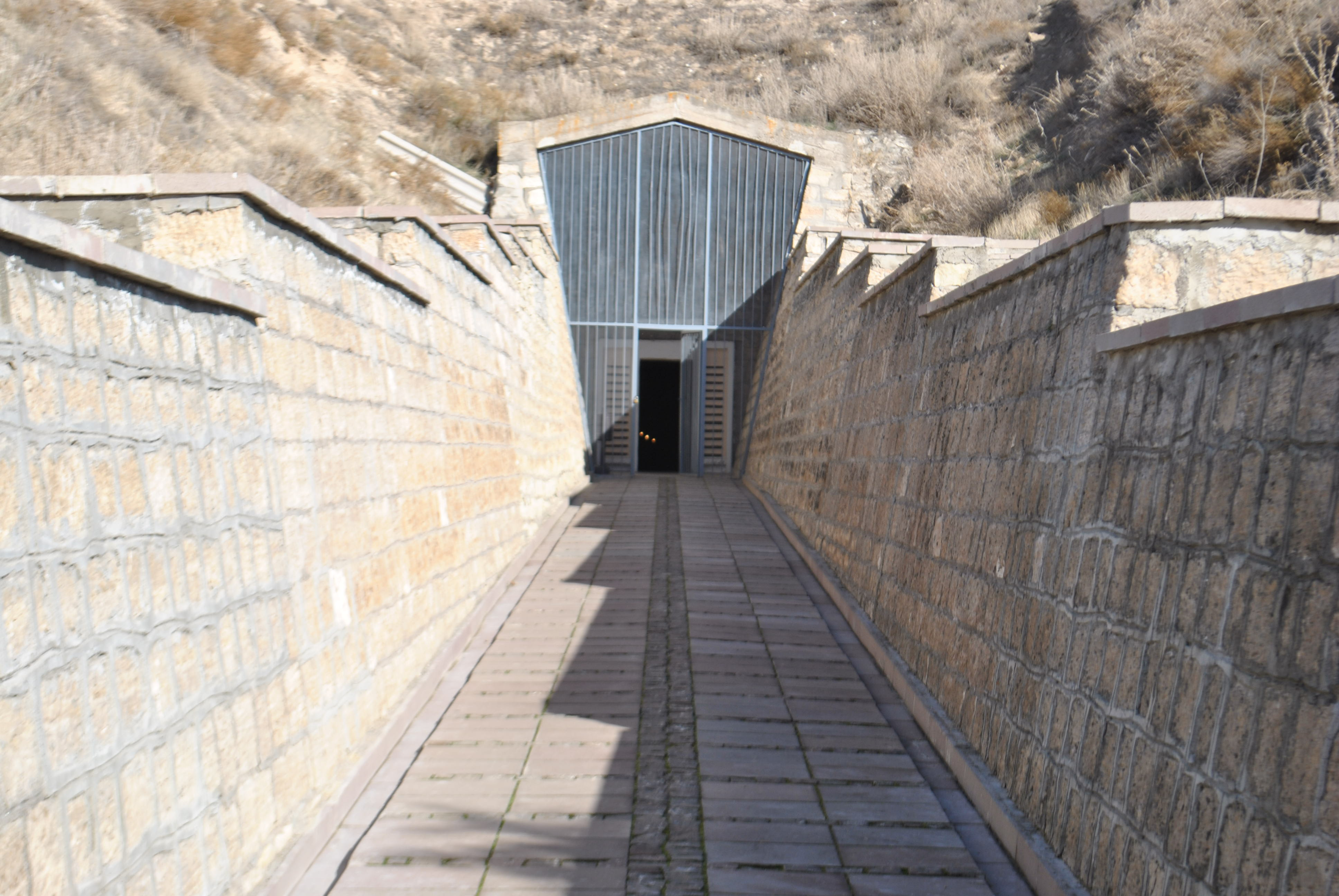

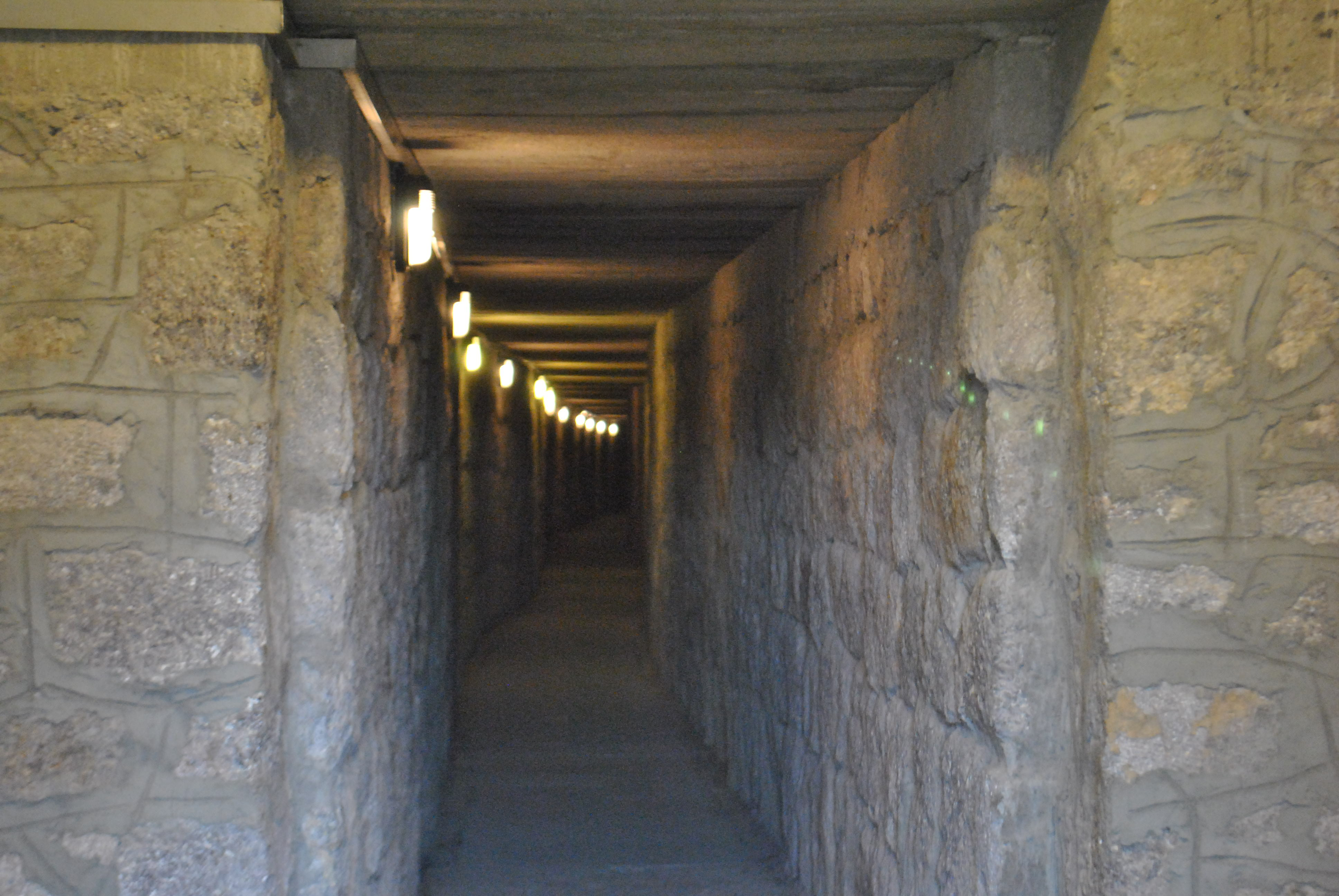

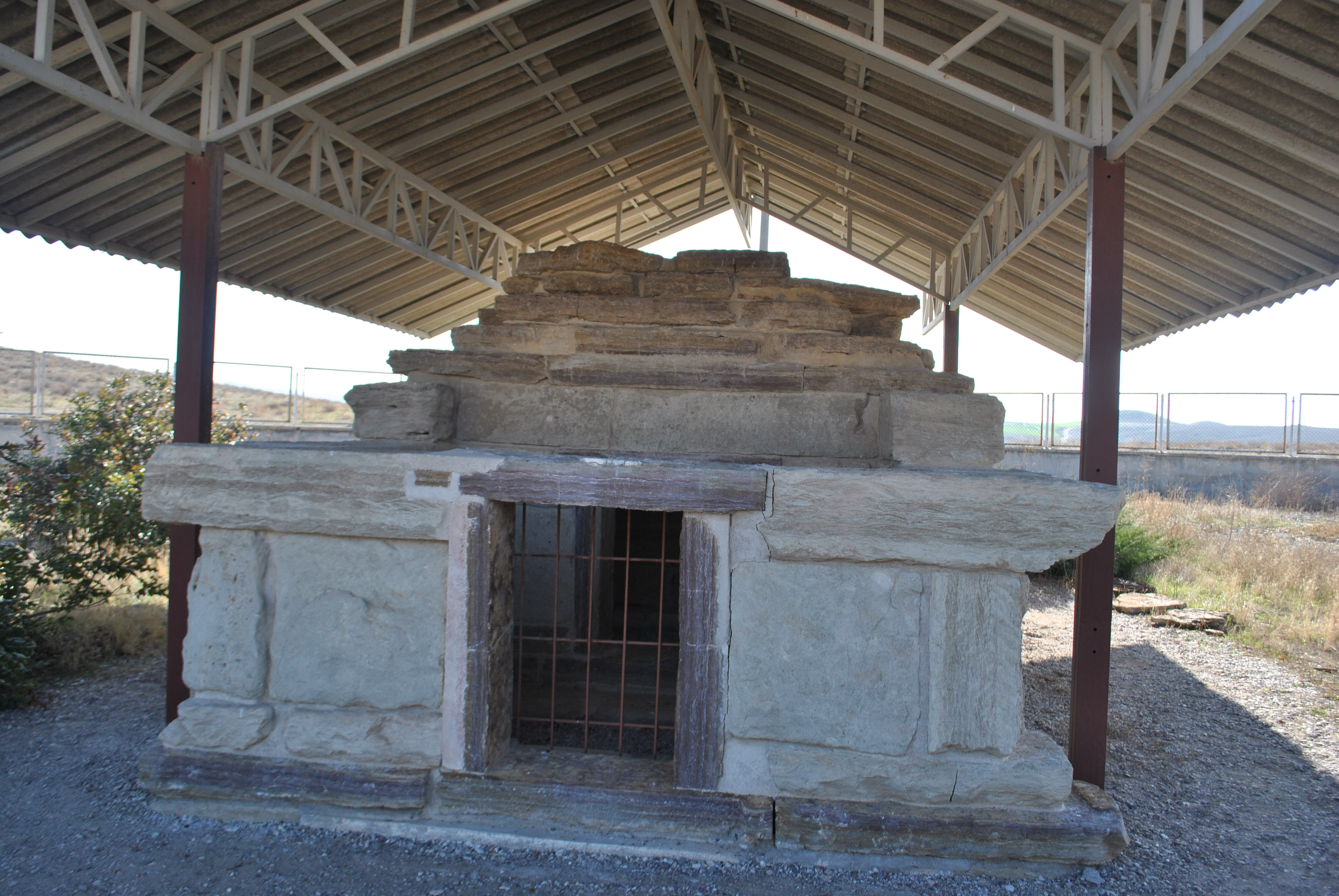

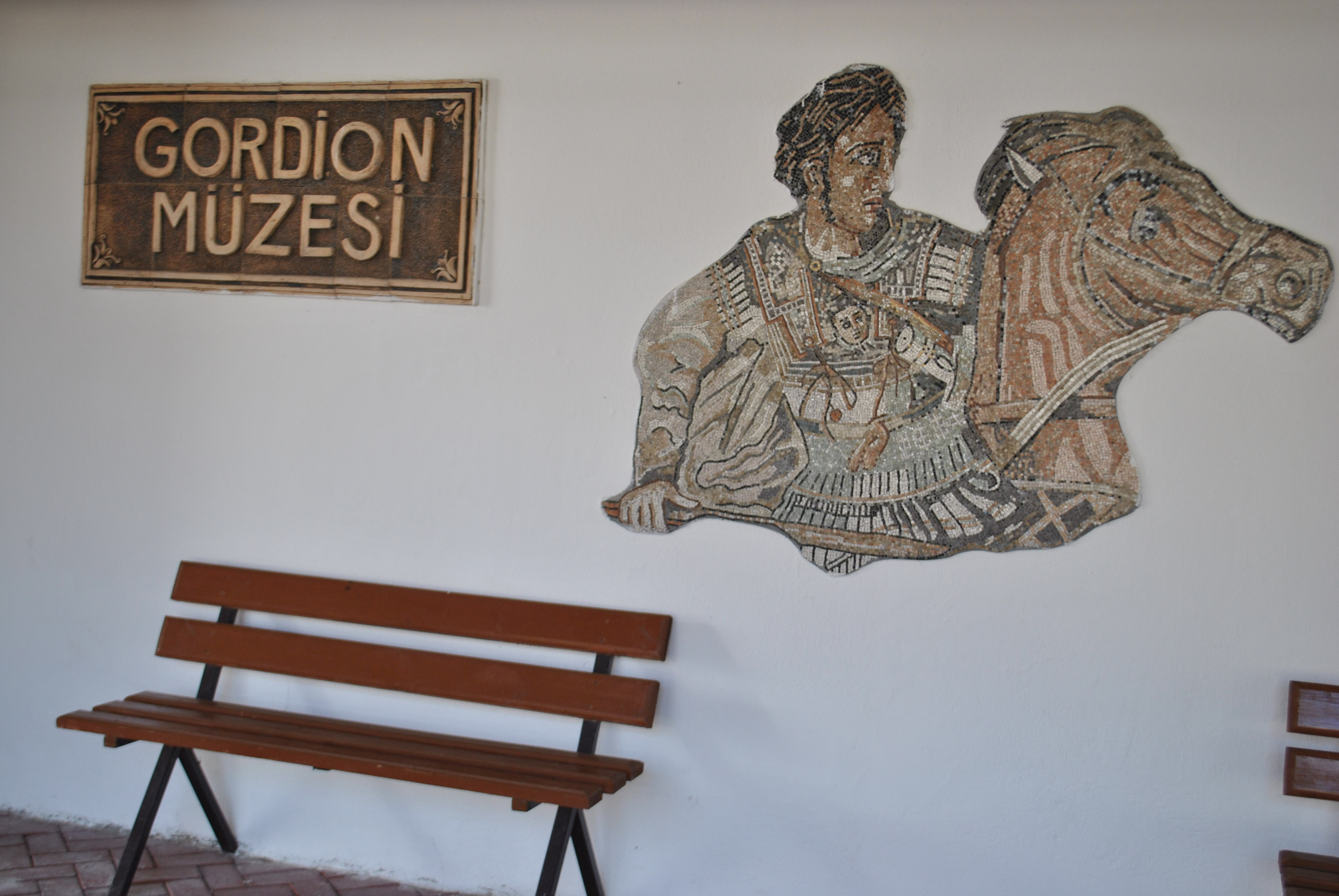

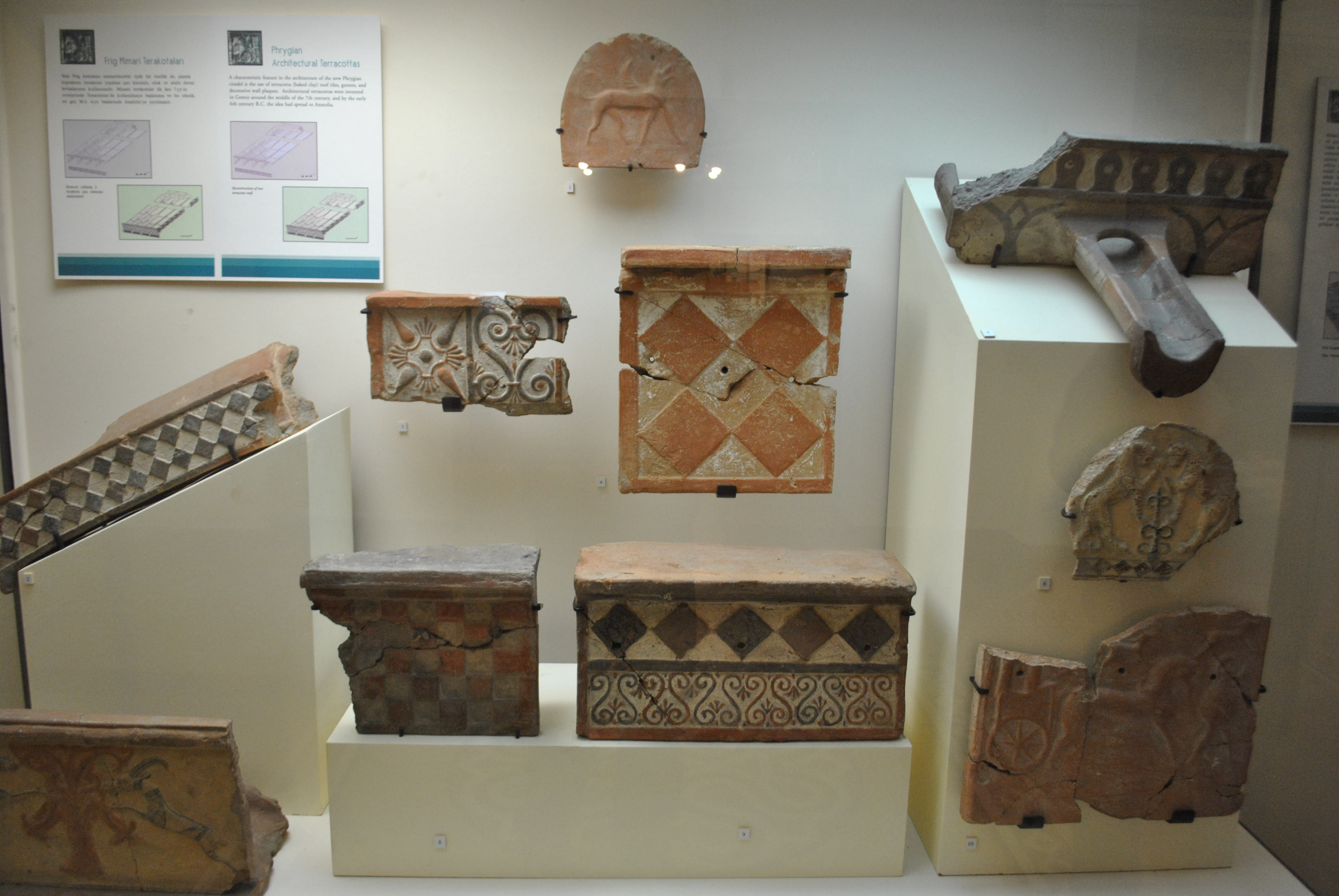

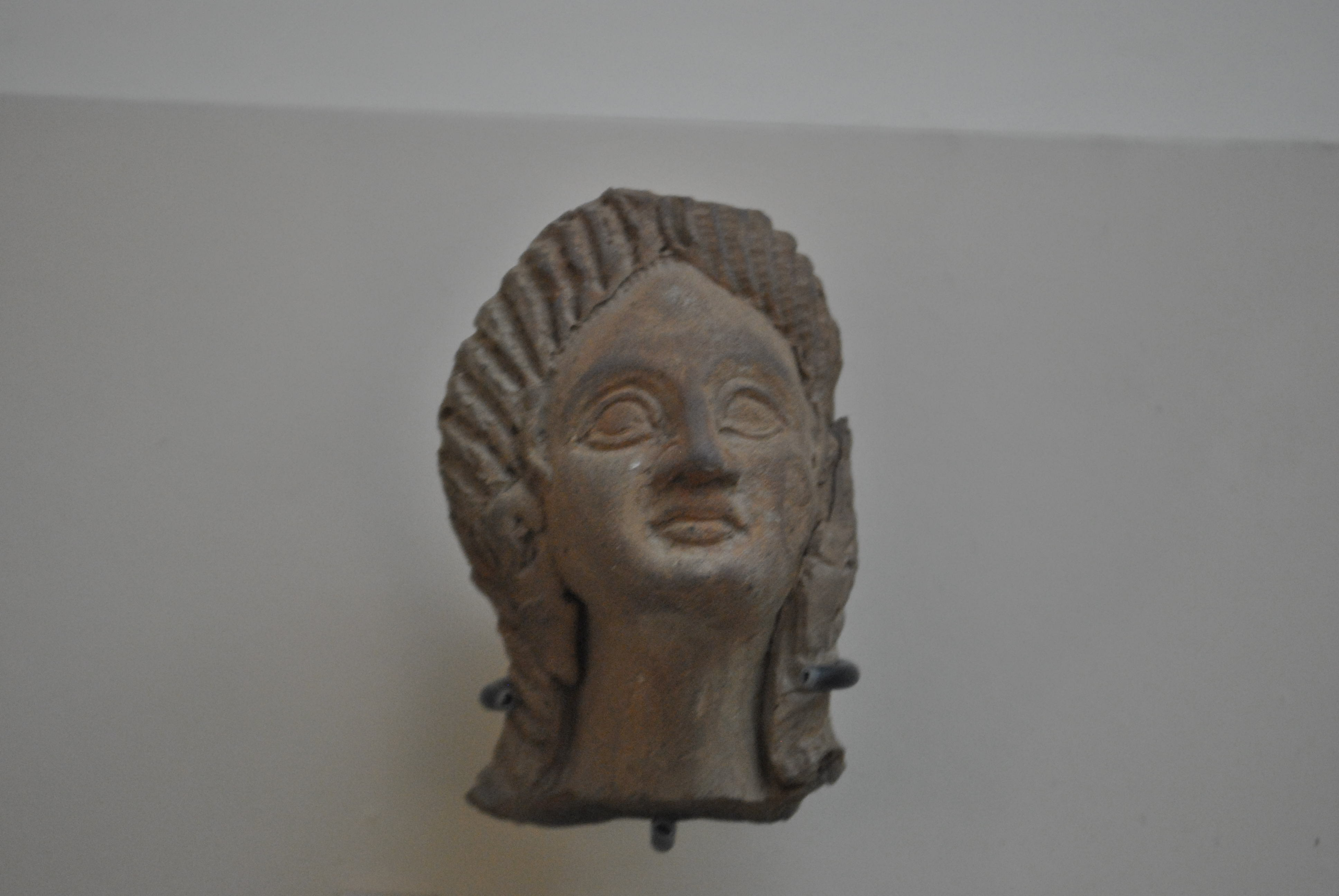
