= Tüfekçioğlu, Polatlı =

Tüfekçioğlu
- Neighbourhood
- Location in Turkey Tüfekçioğlu (Turkey Central Anatolia)
- Coordinates: 39°09′35″N 31°56′27″E
- Country: Turkey
- Province: Ankara
- District: Polatlı
- Population (2022): 119
- Time zone: UTC+3 (TRT)

Tüfekçioğlu is a neighbourhood in the municipality and district of Polatlı, Ankara Province, Turkey. Its population is 119 (2022). The village is populated by Kurds.
