= Sarıoba, Polatlı =

Sarıoba
- Neighbourhood
- Location in Turkey Sarıoba (Turkey Central Anatolia)
- Coordinates: 39°52′N 32°05′E
- Country: Turkey
- Province: Ankara
- District: Polatlı
- Population (2022): 626
- Time zone: UTC+3 (TRT)

Sarıoba is a neighbourhood in the municipality and district of Polatlı, Ankara Province, Turkey. Its population is 626 (2022).
