= Yüzükbaşı, Polatlı =

Yüzükbaşı
- Neighbourhood
- Location in Turkey Yüzükbaşı (Turkey Central Anatolia)
- Coordinates: 39°01′N 32°04′E
- Country: Turkey
- Province: Ankara
- District: Polatlı
- Population (2022): 197
- Time zone: UTC+3 (TRT)

Yüzükbaşı is a neighbourhood in the municipality and district of Polatlı, Ankara Province, Turkey. Its population is 197 (2022). The village is populated by Kurds.
