= Sarıhalil, Polatlı =

Sarıhalil
- Neighbourhood
- Location in Turkey Sarıhalil (Turkey Central Anatolia)
- Coordinates: 39.4244°N 32.2531°E
- Country: Turkey
- Province: Ankara
- District: Polatlı
- Population (2022): 169
- Time zone: UTC+3 (TRT)

Sarıhalil is a neighbourhood in the municipality and district of Polatlı, Ankara Province, Turkey. Its population is 169 (2022).
