= Şıhahmetli, Polatlı =

Şıhahmetli
- Neighbourhood
- Location in Turkey Şıhahmetli (Turkey Central Anatolia)
- Coordinates: 39°06′N 32°14′E
- Country: Turkey
- Province: Ankara
- District: Polatlı
- Population (2022): 323
- Time zone: UTC+3 (TRT)

Şıhahmetli is a neighbourhood in the municipality and district of Polatlı, Ankara Province, Turkey. Its population is 323 (2022). The village is populated by Kurds and Yörüks.
