= Kabakköy, Polatlı =

Kabakköy
- Neighbourhood
- Location in Turkey Kabakköy (Turkey Central Anatolia)
- Coordinates: 39°15′38″N 32°01′17″E
- Country: Turkey
- Province: Ankara
- District: Polatlı
- Population (2022): 169
- Time zone: UTC+3 (TRT)

Kabakköy is a neighbourhood in the municipality and district of Polatlı, Ankara Province, Turkey. Its population is 169 (2022).
