= Yıldızlı, Polatlı =

Yıldızlı
- Neighbourhood
- Location in Turkey Yıldızlı (Turkey Central Anatolia)
- Coordinates: 39.3983°N 32.0819°E
- Country: Turkey
- Province: Ankara
- District: Polatlı
- Population (2022): 130
- Time zone: UTC+3 (TRT)

Yıldızlı is a neighbourhood in the municipality and district of Polatlı, Ankara Province, Turkey. Its population is 130 (2022).
