= Yenimehmetli, Polatlı =

Yenimehmetli
- Neighbourhood
- Location in Turkey Yenimehmetli (Turkey Central Anatolia)
- Coordinates: 39.4200°N 32.1689°E
- Country: Turkey
- Province: Ankara
- District: Polatlı
- Population (2022): 218
- Time zone: UTC+3 (TRT)

Yenimehmetli is a neighbourhood in the municipality and district of Polatlı, Ankara Province, Turkey. Its population is 218 (2022). The village is populated by Kurds.
