= Türktaciri, Polatlı =

Türktaciri
- Neighbourhood
- Location in Turkey Türktaciri (Turkey Central Anatolia)
- Coordinates: 39°13′N 32°00′E
- Country: Turkey
- Province: Ankara
- District: Polatlı
- Population (2022): 238
- Time zone: UTC+3 (TRT)

Türktaciri is a neighbourhood in the municipality and district of Polatlı, Ankara Province, Turkey. Its population is 238 (2022).
