= Sazlar, Polatlı =

Sazlar
- Neighbourhood
- Location in Turkey Sazlar (Turkey Central Anatolia)
- Coordinates: 39.6824°N 31.9264°E
- Country: Turkey
- Province: Ankara
- District: Polatlı
- Population (2022): 248
- Time zone: UTC+3 (TRT)

Sazlar is a neighbourhood in the municipality and district of Polatlı, Ankara Province, Turkey. Its population is 248 (2022).
