= Karailyas, Polatlı =

Karailyas
- Neighbourhood
- Location in Turkey Karailyas (Turkey Central Anatolia)
- Coordinates: 39°33′N 31°59′E
- Country: Turkey
- Province: Ankara
- District: Polatlı
- Population (2022): 333
- Time zone: UTC+3 (TRT)

Karailyas is a neighbourhood in the municipality and district of Polatlı, Ankara Province, Turkey. Its population is 333 (2022).
