= Poyraz, Polatlı =

Poyraz
- Neighbourhood
- Location in Turkey Poyraz (Turkey Central Anatolia)
- Coordinates: 39.7194°N 32.2843°E
- Country: Turkey
- Province: Ankara
- District: Polatlı
- Population (2022): 287
- Time zone: UTC+3 (TRT)

Poyraz is a neighbourhood in the municipality and district of Polatlı, Ankara Province, Turkey. Its population is 287 (2022).
