= Ilıca, Polatlı =

Ilıca
- Neighbourhood
- Location in Turkey Ilıca (Turkey Central Anatolia)
- Coordinates: 39.3066°N 32.2081°E
- Country: Turkey
- Province: Ankara
- District: Polatlı
- Population (2022): 213
- Time zone: UTC+3 (TRT)

Ilıca is a neighbourhood in the municipality and district of Polatlı, Ankara Province, Turkey. Its population is 213 (2022). The village is populated by both Kurds and Turks.
