= Yeniköseler, Polatlı =

Yeniköseler
- Neighbourhood
- Location in Turkey Yeniköseler (Turkey Central Anatolia)
- Coordinates: 39°44′N 31°56′E
- Country: Turkey
- Province: Ankara
- District: Polatlı
- Population (2022): 388
- Time zone: UTC+3 (TRT)

Yeniköseler is a neighbourhood in the municipality and district of Polatlı, Ankara Province, Turkey. Its population is 388 (2022).
