= Yeşilöz, Polatlı =

Yeşilöz
- Neighbourhood
- Country: Turkey
- Province: Ankara
- District: Polatlı
- Population (2022): 239
- Time zone: UTC+3 (TRT)

Yeşilöz is a neighbourhood in the municipality and district of Polatlı, Ankara Province, Turkey. Its population is 239 (2022). The village is populated by Kurds.
