= Karacaahmet, Polatlı =

Karacaahmet
- Neighbourhood
- Location in Turkey Karacaahmet (Turkey Central Anatolia)
- Coordinates: 39.7271°N 31.9453°E
- Country: Turkey
- Province: Ankara
- District: Polatlı
- Population (2022): 248
- Time zone: UTC+3 (TRT)

Karacaahmet is a neighbourhood in the municipality and district of Polatlı, Ankara Province, Turkey. Its population is 248 (2022).
