= Olukpınar, Polatlı =

Olukpınar
- Neighbourhood
- Location in Turkey Olukpınar (Turkey Central Anatolia)
- Coordinates: 39.6833°N 32.3333°E
- Country: Turkey
- Province: Ankara
- District: Polatlı
- Population (2022): 108
- Time zone: UTC+3 (TRT)

Olukpınar is a neighbourhood in the municipality and district of Polatlı, Ankara Province, Turkey. Its population is 108 (2022).
