= Karabenli, Polatlı =

Karabenli
- Neighbourhood
- Location in Turkey Karabenli (Turkey Central Anatolia)
- Coordinates: 39°22′N 32°13′E
- Country: Turkey
- Province: Ankara
- District: Polatlı
- Population (2022): 121
- Time zone: UTC+3 (TRT)

Karabenli is a neighbourhood in the municipality and district of Polatlı, Ankara Province, Turkey. Its population is 121 (2022). The village is populated by Kurds.
