= Karakuyu, Polatlı =

Karakuyu
- Neighbourhood
- Location in Turkey Karakuyu (Turkey Central Anatolia)
- Coordinates: 39.4497°N 32.2218°E
- Country: Turkey
- Province: Ankara
- District: Polatlı
- Population (2022): 96
- Time zone: UTC+3 (TRT)

Karakuyu is a neighbourhood in the municipality and district of Polatlı, Ankara Province, Turkey. Its population is 96 (2022).
