= Ördekgölü, Polatlı =

Ördekgölü
- Neighbourhood
- Location in Turkey Ördekgölü (Turkey Central Anatolia)
- Coordinates: 39°21′N 32°17′E
- Country: Turkey
- Province: Ankara
- District: Polatlı
- Population (2022): 94
- Time zone: UTC+3 (TRT)

Ördekgölü is a neighbourhood in the municipality and district of Polatlı, Ankara Province, Turkey. Its population is 94 (2022).
