= Sivri, Polatlı =

Sivri
- Neighbourhood
- Location in Turkey Sivri (Turkey Central Anatolia)
- Coordinates: 39.4314°N 32.3071°E
- Country: Turkey
- Province: Ankara
- District: Polatlı
- Population (2022): 150
- Time zone: UTC+3 (TRT)

Sivri is a neighbourhood in the municipality and district of Polatlı, Ankara Province, Turkey. Its population is 150 (2022).
