= Şeyhali, Polatlı =

Şeyhali
- Neighbourhood
- Location in Turkey Şeyhali (Turkey Central Anatolia)
- Coordinates: 39.4992°N 32.2942°E
- Country: Turkey
- Province: Ankara
- District: Polatlı
- Population (2022): 183
- Time zone: UTC+3 (TRT)

Şeyhali is a neighbourhood in the municipality and district of Polatlı, Ankara Province, Turkey. Its population is 183 (2022).
