= Sabanca, Polatlı =

Sabanca
- Neighbourhood
- Location in Turkey Sabanca (Turkey Central Anatolia)
- Coordinates: 39.3643°N 32.2630°E
- Country: Turkey
- Province: Ankara
- District: Polatlı
- Population (2022): 77
- Time zone: UTC+3 (TRT)

Sabanca is a neighbourhood in the municipality and district of Polatlı, Ankara Province, Turkey. Its population is 77 (2022). The village is populated by Kurds.
