= Macun, Polatlı =

Macun
- Neighbourhood
- Location in Turkey Macun (Turkey Central Anatolia)
- Coordinates: 39.6357°N 32.3042°E
- Country: Turkey
- Province: Ankara
- District: Polatlı
- Population (2022): 229
- Time zone: UTC+3 (TRT)

Macun is a neighbourhood in the municipality and district of Polatlı, Ankara Province, Turkey. Its population is 229 (2022).
