= Kızılcakışla, Polatlı =

Kızılcakışla
- Neighbourhood
- Location in Turkey Kızılcakışla (Turkey Central Anatolia)
- Coordinates: 39.5149°N 32.3275°E
- Country: Turkey
- Province: Ankara
- District: Polatlı
- Population (2022): 89
- Time zone: UTC+3 (TRT)

Kızılcakışla is a neighbourhood in the municipality and district of Polatlı, Ankara Province, Turkey. Its population is 89 (2022).
