= Beşköprü, Polatlı =

Beşköprü
- Neighbourhood
- Location in Turkey Beşköprü (Turkey Central Anatolia)
- Coordinates: 39.3110°N 32.0349°E
- Country: Turkey
- Province: Ankara
- District: Polatlı
- Population (2022): 119
- Time zone: UTC+3 (TRT)

Beşköprü is a neighbourhood in the municipality and district of Polatlı, Ankara Province, Turkey. Its population is 119 (2022).
