= Hacımusa, Polatlı =

Hacımusa
- Neighbourhood
- Location in Turkey Hacımusa (Turkey Central Anatolia)
- Coordinates: 39.03629°N 32.2560°E
- Country: Turkey
- Province: Ankara
- District: Polatlı
- Population (2022): 177
- Time zone: UTC+3 (TRT)

Hacımusa is a neighbourhood in the municipality and district of Polatlı, Ankara Province, Turkey. Its population is 177 (2022). The village is populated by Kurds.
