= Avşar, Polatlı =

Avşar
- Neighbourhood
- Location in Turkey Avşar (Turkey Central Anatolia)
- Coordinates: 39.7643°N 32.1217°E
- Country: Turkey
- Province: Ankara
- District: Polatlı
- Population (2022): 43
- Time zone: UTC+3 (TRT)

Avşar is a neighbourhood in the municipality and district of Polatlı, Ankara Province, Turkey. Its population is 43 (2022).
