= Kargalı, Polatlı =

Kargalı
- Neighbourhood
- Location in Turkey Kargalı (Turkey Central Anatolia)
- Coordinates: 39.5878°N 32.2589°E
- Country: Turkey
- Province: Ankara
- District: Polatlı
- Population (2022): 363
- Time zone: UTC+3 (TRT)

Kargalı is a neighbourhood in the municipality and district of Polatlı, Ankara Province, Turkey. Its population is 363 (2022).
