= İnler, Polatlı =

İnler
- Neighbourhood
- Location in Turkey İnler (Turkey Central Anatolia)
- Coordinates: 39.2609°N 32.2546°E
- Country: Turkey
- Province: Ankara
- District: Polatlı
- Population (2022): 338
- Time zone: UTC+3 (TRT)

İnler is a neighbourhood in the municipality and district of Polatlı, Ankara Province, Turkey. Its population is 338 (2022). It is located 115 km from Ankara city and 45 km from Polatlı town. The village is populated by Kurds.
