= Uzunbey, Polatlı =

Uzunbey
- Neighbourhood
- Location in Turkey Uzunbey (Turkey Central Anatolia)
- Coordinates: 39°05′N 32°00′E
- Country: Turkey
- Province: Ankara
- District: Polatlı
- Population (2022): 396
- Time zone: UTC+3 (TRT)

Uzunbey is a neighbourhood in the municipality and district of Polatlı, Ankara Province, Turkey. Its population is 396 (2022). The village is populated by Kurds.
