= Avdanlı, Polatlı =

Avdanlı
- Neighbourhood
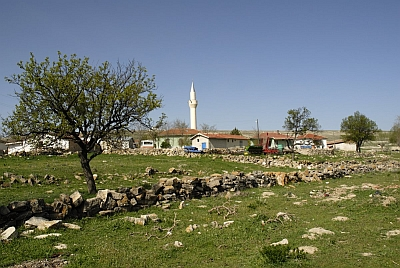
- Avdanlı village

- Location within Turkey Location within Turkey Central Anatolia
- Coordinates: 39°22′N 32°06′E
- Country: Turkey
- Province: Ankara
- District: Polatlı
- Population (2022): 72
- Time zone: UTC+3 (TRT)

Avdanlı is a neighbourhood in the municipality and district of Polatlı, Ankara Province, Turkey. Its population is 72 (2022).
