= Kıranharmanı, Polatlı =

Kıranharmanı
- Neighbourhood
- Location in Turkey Kıranharmanı (Turkey Central Anatolia)
- Coordinates: 39°40′N 31°58′E
- Country: Turkey
- Province: Ankara
- District: Polatlı
- Population (2022): 173
- Time zone: UTC+3 (TRT)

Kıranharmanı is a neighbourhood in the municipality and district of Polatlı, Ankara Province, Turkey. Its population is 173 (2022).
