= Eskipolatlı, Polatlı =

Eskipolatlı
- Neighbourhood
- Location in Turkey Eskipolatlı (Turkey Central Anatolia)
- Coordinates: 39°32′N 32°11′E
- Country: Turkey
- Province: Ankara
- District: Polatlı
- Population (2022): 138
- Time zone: UTC+3 (TRT)

Eskipolatlı is a neighbourhood in the municipality and district of Polatlı, Ankara Province, Turkey. Its population is 138 (2022).
