= Hacıosmanoğlu, Polatlı =

Hacıosmanoğlu
- Neighbourhood
- Location in Turkey Hacıosmanoğlu (Turkey Central Anatolia)
- Coordinates: 39.1381°N 31.9578°E
- Country: Turkey
- Province: Ankara
- District: Polatlı
- Population (2022): 169
- Time zone: UTC+3 (TRT)

Hacıosmanoğlu is a neighbourhood in the municipality and district of Polatlı, Ankara Province, Turkey. Its population is 169 (2022). The village is populated by Kurds.
