= Müslüm, Polatlı =

Müslüm
- Neighbourhood
- Country: Turkey
- Province: Ankara
- District: Polatlı
- Population (2022): 319
- Time zone: UTC+3 (TRT)

Müslüm is a neighbourhood in the municipality and district of Polatlı, Ankara Province, Turkey. Its population is 319 (2022).
