= Karayavşan, Polatlı =

Karayavşan
- Neighbourhood
- Location in Turkey Karayavşan (Turkey Central Anatolia)
- Coordinates: 39°30′N 32°21′E
- Country: Turkey
- Province: Ankara
- District: Polatlı
- Population (2022): 77
- Time zone: UTC+3 (TRT)

Karayavşan is a neighbourhood in the municipality and district of Polatlı, Ankara Province, Turkey. Its population is 77 (2022).
