= Sakarya, Polatlı =

Sakarya
- Neighbourhood
- Location in Turkey Sakarya (Turkey Central Anatolia)
- Coordinates: 39.5033°N 32.0758°E
- Country: Turkey
- Province: Ankara
- District: Polatlı
- Population (2022): 172
- Time zone: UTC+3 (TRT)

Sakarya is a neighbourhood in the municipality and district of Polatlı, Ankara Province, Turkey. Its population is 172 (2022).
