= Karahamzalı, Polatlı =

Karahamzalı
- Neighbourhood
- Location in Turkey Karahamzalı (Turkey Central Anatolia)
- Coordinates: 39.4445°N 32.1196°E
- Country: Turkey
- Province: Ankara
- District: Polatlı
- Population (2022): 752
- Time zone: UTC+3 (TRT)

Karahamzalı is a neighbourhood in the municipality and district of Polatlı, Ankara Province, Turkey. Its population is 752 (2022).
