= Yağmurbaba, Polatlı =

Yağmurbaba
- Neighbourhood
- Location in Turkey Yağmurbaba (Turkey Central Anatolia)
- Coordinates: 39°42′N 32°10′E
- Country: Turkey
- Province: Ankara
- District: Polatlı
- Population (2022): 58
- Time zone: UTC+3 (TRT)

Yağmurbaba is a neighbourhood in the municipality and district of Polatlı, Ankara Province, Turkey. Its population is 58 (2022).
