= Çanakçı, Polatlı =

Çanakçı
- Neighbourhood
- Location in Turkey Çanakçı (Turkey Central Anatolia)
- Coordinates: 39°26′47″N 32°04′56″E
- Country: Turkey
- Province: Ankara
- District: Polatlı
- Population (2022): 184
- Time zone: UTC+3 (TRT)

Çanakçı is a neighbourhood in the municipality and district of Polatlı, Ankara Province, Turkey. Its population is 184 (2022).
