= Babayakup, Polatlı =

Babayakup
- Neighbourhood
- Location within Turkey Location within Turkey Central Anatolia
- Coordinates: 39°36′N 32°24′E
- Country: Turkey
- Province: Ankara
- District: Polatlı
- Population (2023): 231
- Time zone: UTC+3 (TRT)

Babayakup is a neighbourhood in the municipality and district of Polatlı, Ankara Province, Turkey. Its population is 231 as of 2023.

== History ==
The village is named after Yakup Baba, whose tomb located in the neighborhood.

== Geography ==
It is located 52 kilometres (32 mi; 28 nmi) from Ankara and 29 kilometres (18 mi; 16 nmi) from Polatlı.

== Population ==
Historical population

Year	Pop.	±% p.a.
2013	148	—
2014	174	+17.57%
2015	185	+6.32%
2016	186	+0.54%
2017	205	+10.22%
2018	243	+18.54%

Year	Pop.	±% p.a.
2019	235	−3.29%
2020	229	−2.55%
2021	231	+0.87%
2022	232	+0.43%
2023	231	−0.43%

Source: Address-Based Population Registration System, Turkish Statistical Institute (2013-2023)
