= Güreş, Polatlı =

Güreş
- Neighbourhood
- Location in Turkey Güreş (Turkey Central Anatolia)
- Coordinates: 39.8195°N 32.1982°E
- Country: Turkey
- Province: Ankara
- District: Polatlı
- Population (2022): 199
- Time zone: UTC+3 (TRT)

Güreş is a neighbourhood in the municipality and district of Polatlı, Ankara Province, Turkey. Its population is 199 (2022).
