= A89 =

A89 or A-89 may refer to:

- A89 motorway (France)
- A89 road (Scotland)
- Dutch Defence, in the Encyclopaedia of Chess Openings
- Beauvechain Air Base, Advanced Landing Ground A89 during World War II
