= Utah State Route 89 (disambiguation) =

State Route 89

Location
- Country: United States
- State: Utah

Highway system
- Utah State Highway System; Interstate; US; State; Minor; Scenic
← SR-88	→ SR-90

Utah State Route 89 is the legislative overlay designation for U.S. Route 89 (US 89) within Utah, United States. By Utah State law, US 89 within the state (except concurrencies) has been defined as "State Route 89" since 1977).

Utah State Route 89 may also refer to:

- Utah State Route 89 (1975-1977), a former state route in the Ogden Valley in eastern Weber County, Utah, United States, that connected Utah State Route 162 (now Utah State Route 158) at a junction in the Wasatch-Cache National Forest (north of the Pineview Reservoir) with Utah State Route 166 (now Utah State Route 162) in Eden. (The route was renumbered as Utah State route 169 in 1977.)
- Utah State Route 89 (1935-1953), a short former state route in southwestern Summit County, Utah, United States, that connected Utah State Route 35 in Francis with the former Utah State Route 151 at the Driscoll Dugway (East Lower River Road) south of Francis

== See also ==
- List of state highways in Utah
- List of U.S. Highways in Utah
