= Yenidoğan, Polatlı =

Yenidoğan
- Neighbourhood
- Location in Turkey Yenidoğan (Turkey Central Anatolia)
- Coordinates: 39.6897°N 32.2675°E
- Country: Turkey
- Province: Ankara
- District: Polatlı
- Population (2022): 90
- Time zone: UTC+3 (TRT)

Yenidoğan is a neighbourhood in the municipality and district of Polatlı, Ankara Province, Turkey. Its population is 90 (2022).
