= Virginia State Route 88 =

The following highways in Virginia have been known as State Route 88:

- State Route 88 (Virginia 1933–1940), now part of Virginia State Route 16
- State Route 88 (Virginia 1940-1948), Branchville to Purdy
- SR 88, used as a planning number for Interstate 495 (Capital Beltway) in Virginion in the 1950s
- SR 88, used as a planning number for State Route 146 (Virginia) in the 1970s
