= Yassıhüyük, Polatlı =

Yassıhüyük
- Neighbourhood
- Location in Turkey Yassıhüyük (Turkey Central Anatolia)
- Coordinates: 39.6562°N 31.9910°E
- Country: Turkey
- Province: Ankara
- District: Polatlı
- Population (2022): 182
- Time zone: UTC+3 (TRT)

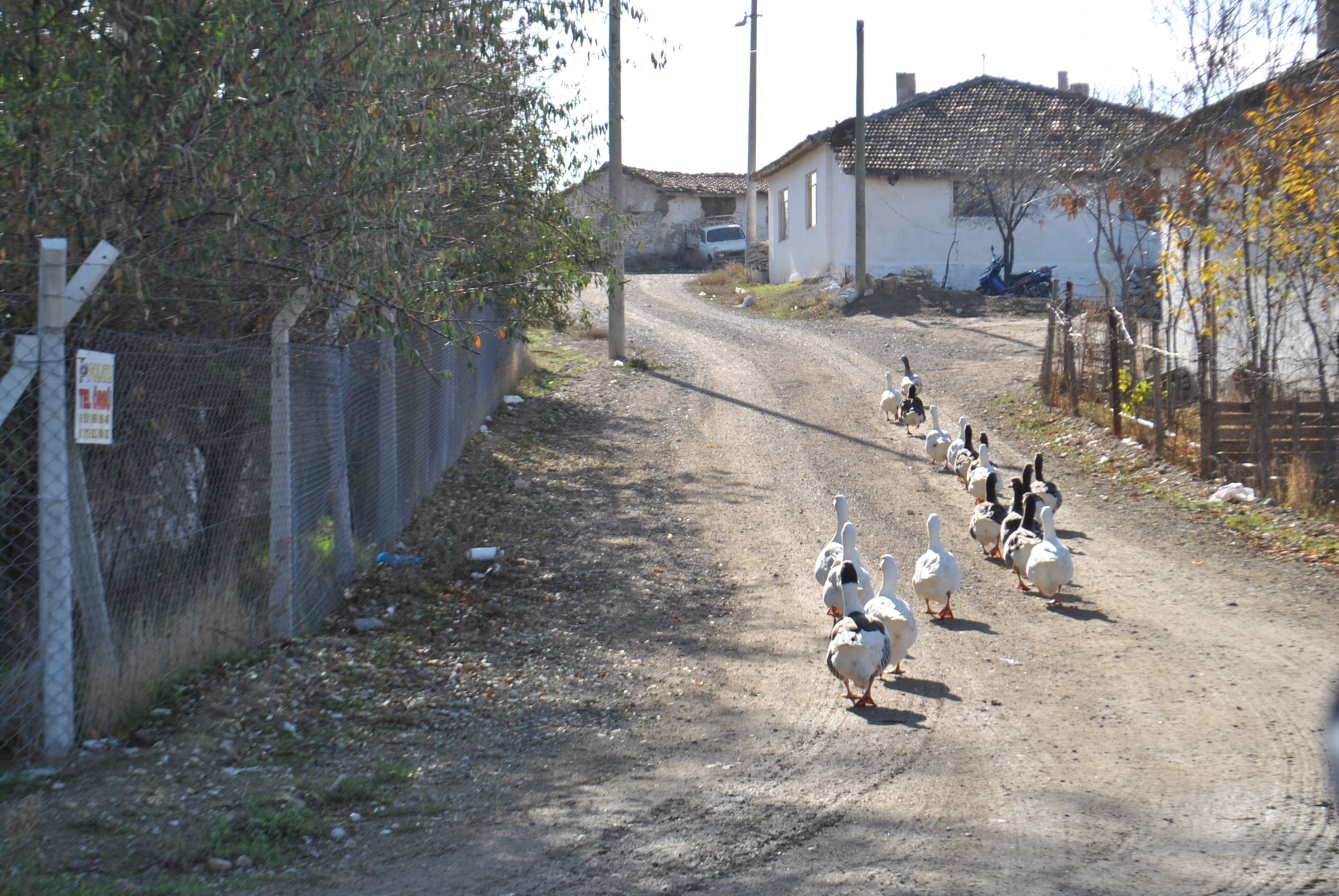
Yassıhöyük, Polatlı

Yassıhüyük is a neighbourhood in the municipality and district of Polatlı of Ankara Province, Turkey. Its population is 182 (2022).
