= A88 =

A88 or A-88 may refer to:

- A88 road, a major road in Scotland, UK
- A88 autoroute, a major road in Western France
- Dutch Defence, in the Encyclopaedia of Chess Openings
- Exterritorial highway A88 (Breslau — Wien), a never-completed highway of Nazi Germany, crossing the Protectorate of Bohemia and Moravia
- The A88, an Apple iPhone clone manufactured by CECT
