= List of highways numbered 89A =

The following highways are numbered 89A:

== United States ==
- U.S. Route 89A
- Arizona State Route 89A
- Illinois Route 89A (former)
- New York State Route 89A (former)
