= AH87 =

Road in Turkey

Asian Highway 87 (AH87) is a road in the Asian Highway Network running 606 km (379 miles) from Ankara to İzmir, Turkey. The route is as follows:

- D.200 Road D200: Ankara–Sivrihisar
- D.260 Road D260: Sivrihisar–Afyonkarahisar
- D.300 Road D300: Afyonkarahisar–Uşak–İzmir
