= A87 =

A87 or A-87 may refer to:

- A87 autoroute, a motorway in western France
- A87 road, a road in Highland, Scotland
- Dutch Defence, in the Encyclopaedia of Chess Openings, first cited in 1789
- Stuart Highway, a South Australian highway signed as A87, established 1860
- Brussels South Charleroi Airport, Advanced Landing Ground A87 during World War II
- Aéropostale (clothing), a clothing company founded in 1987
