= Polatlı =

- District and municipality
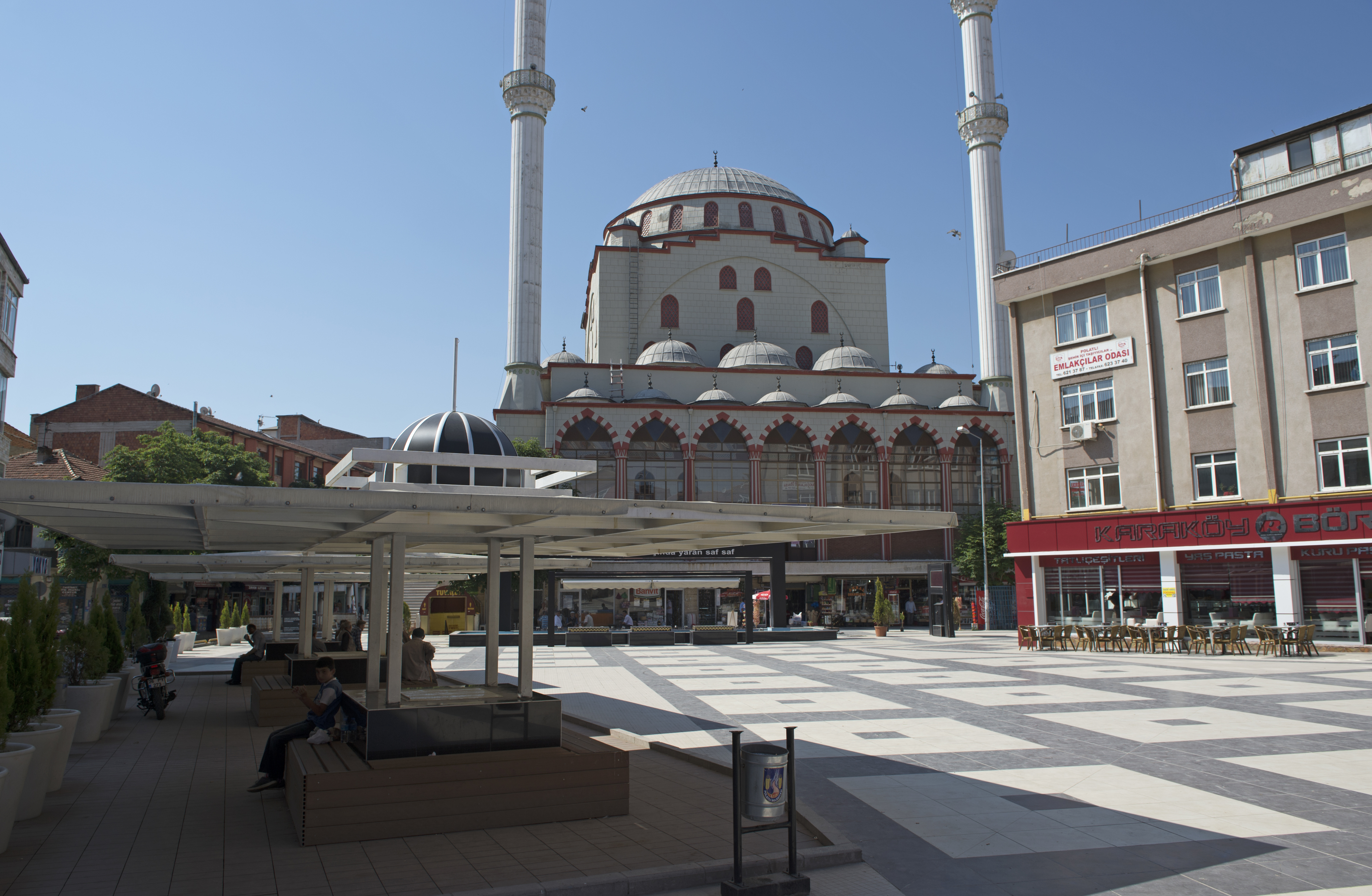
- Polatlı Çarşı Mosque

- Logo

- Map showing Polatlı District in Ankara Province

- Location within Turkey Location within Turkey Central Anatolia
- Coordinates: 39°35′03″N 32°08′50″E
- Country: Turkey
- Province: Ankara

Government
  - Mayor: Mürsel Yıldızkaya (CHP)
- Area: 3,618 km^{2} (1,397 sq mi)
- Elevation: 853 m (2,799 ft)
- Population (2022): 128,378
  - Density: 35.48/km^{2} (91.90/sq mi)
- Time zone: UTC+3 (TRT)
- Postal code: 06900
- Area code: 0312
- Website: www.polatli.bel.tr

Polatlı (formerly Ancient Greek: Γόρδιον, Górdion and Latin: Gordium) is a municipality and district of Ankara Province, Turkey. Its area is 3,618 km^{2}, and its population is 128,378 (2022). It is 80 km west of the Turkish capital Ankara, on the road to Eskişehir. Its elevation is 853 m.

== Geography ==
Polatlı is situated at the heart of the high Anatolian Plateau, a large steppe covered with grass. Far from the coast, it has a typical steppe climate. The winters are cold and generally snowy, the summers are hot and dry. Spring and autumn are the wettest seasons (especially the former). Polatlı is one of the most productive agricultural districts in Turkey and is best known for its cereal production, especially barley and wheat. Polatlı is one of Turkey's largest grain stores. Sugar beet, melon and onion are also grown.

Climate data for Polatlı (1991–2020)
Month	Jan	Feb	Mar	Apr	May	Jun	Jul	Aug	Sep	Oct	Nov	Dec	Year
Mean daily maximum °C (°F)	4.4 (39.9)	7.2 (45.0)	12.4 (54.3)	17.7 (63.9)	23.1 (73.6)	27.8 (82.0)	31.7 (89.1)	31.6 (88.9)	27.0 (80.6)	20.4 (68.7)	12.8 (55.0)	6.4 (43.5)	18.6 (65.5)
Daily mean °C (°F)	0.3 (32.5)	2.1 (35.8)	6.2 (43.2)	11.0 (51.8)	16.1 (61.0)	20.4 (68.7)	24.2 (75.6)	24.1 (75.4)	19.5 (67.1)	13.7 (56.7)	7.0 (44.6)	2.3 (36.1)	12.3 (54.1)
Mean daily minimum °C (°F)	−3.0 (26.6)	−2.1 (28.2)	1.0 (33.8)	5.0 (41.0)	9.3 (48.7)	12.9 (55.2)	16.2 (61.2)	16.4 (61.5)	12.3 (54.1)	7.9 (46.2)	2.3 (36.1)	−1.0 (30.2)	6.5 (43.7)
Average precipitation mm (inches)	35.03 (1.38)	32.69 (1.29)	39.48 (1.55)	40.83 (1.61)	42.52 (1.67)	39.81 (1.57)	12.48 (0.49)	11.55 (0.45)	15.63 (0.62)	31.1 (1.22)	27.97 (1.10)	40.17 (1.58)	369.26 (14.54)
Average precipitation days (≥ 1.0 mm)	7.0	6.2	6.7	6.5	7.4	5.5	2.3	2.4	3.1	5.4	4.6	7.3	64.4
Average relative humidity (%)	81.2	74.4	65.4	60.9	58.7	53.4	44.7	45.2	48.0	59.9	70.7	80.7	61.9
Source: NOAA

== History ==
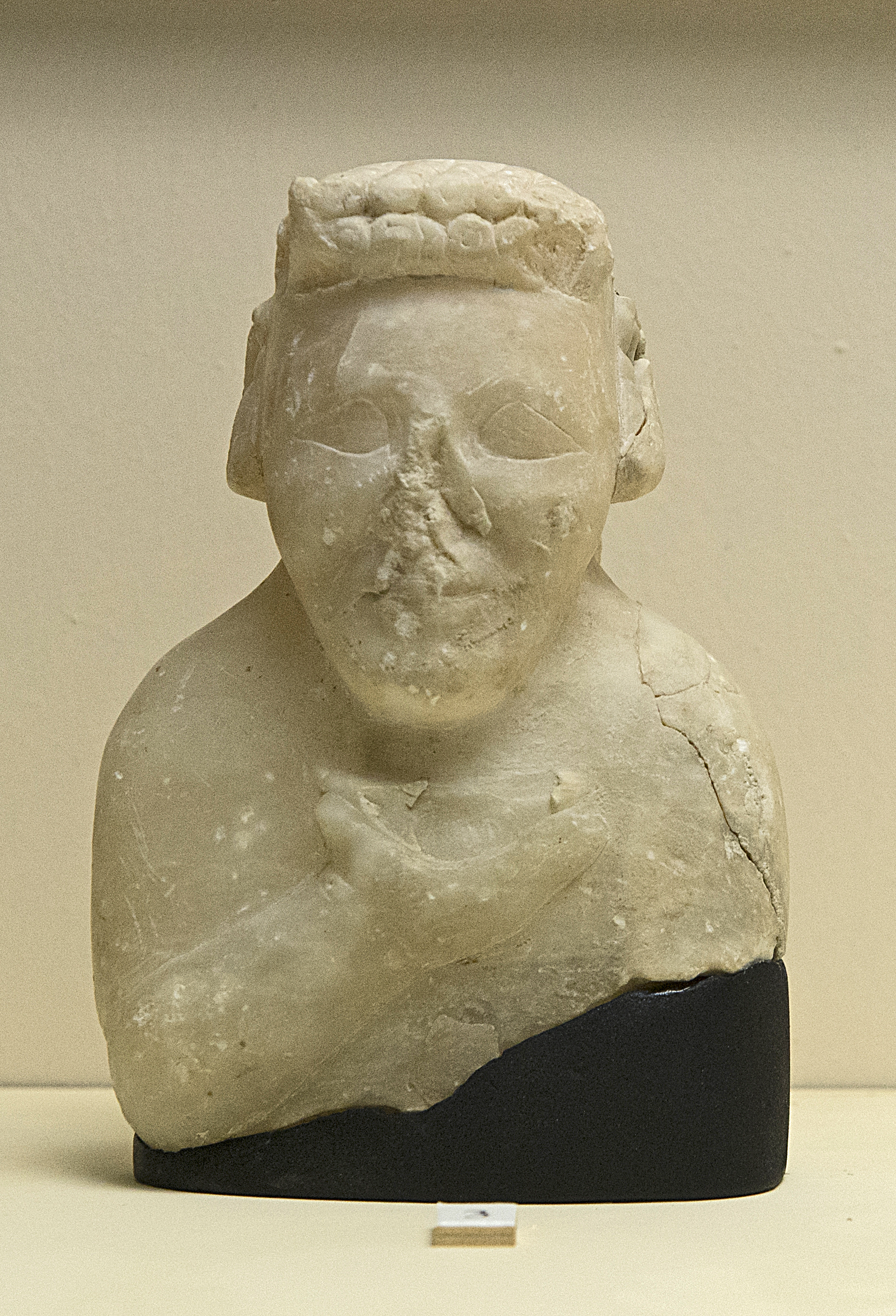
Statue at the Gordion Museum.

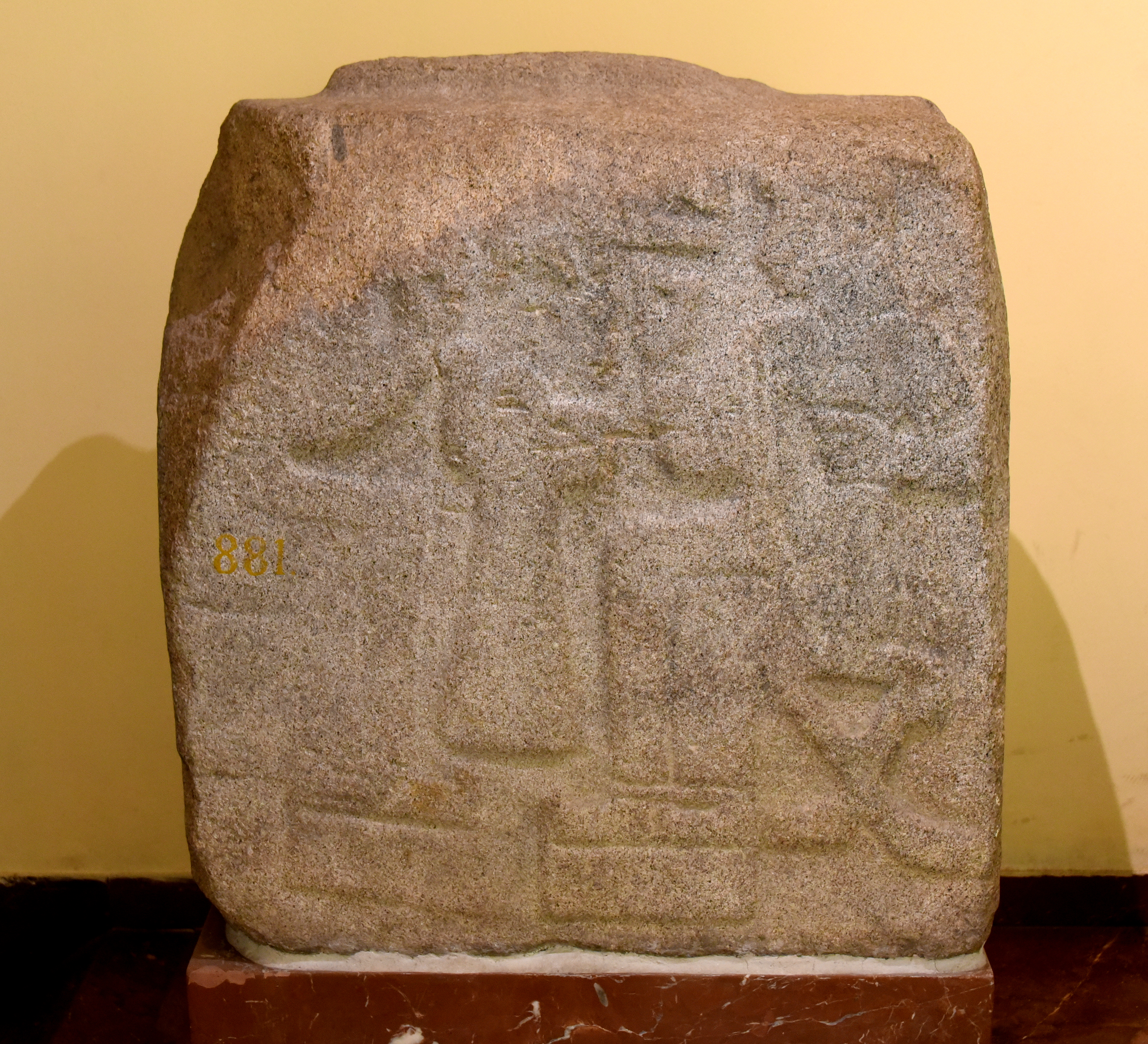
Relief stele showing a banquet scene. From Yağri, Polatlı. Hittite Empire Period, 14th century BC. Museum of the Ancient Orient, Istanbul

=== Ancient settlement ===
The ancient Phrygian capital Gordion is 10 km from the city of Polatlı.

On the outskirts of Polatli there is an archaeological mound of the same name, the remains of a multi-layered settlement of the Bronze Age (3rd-2nd millennium BC). Since the mound was being used by local people as a quarry, rescue excavations of its southern and central parts were carried out in 1949 by the Anglo-Turkish expedition led by Seton Lloyd, and Nuri Gökçe, then the director of the ‘Hittite Museum in Ankara’. It was a village along the important caravan route.

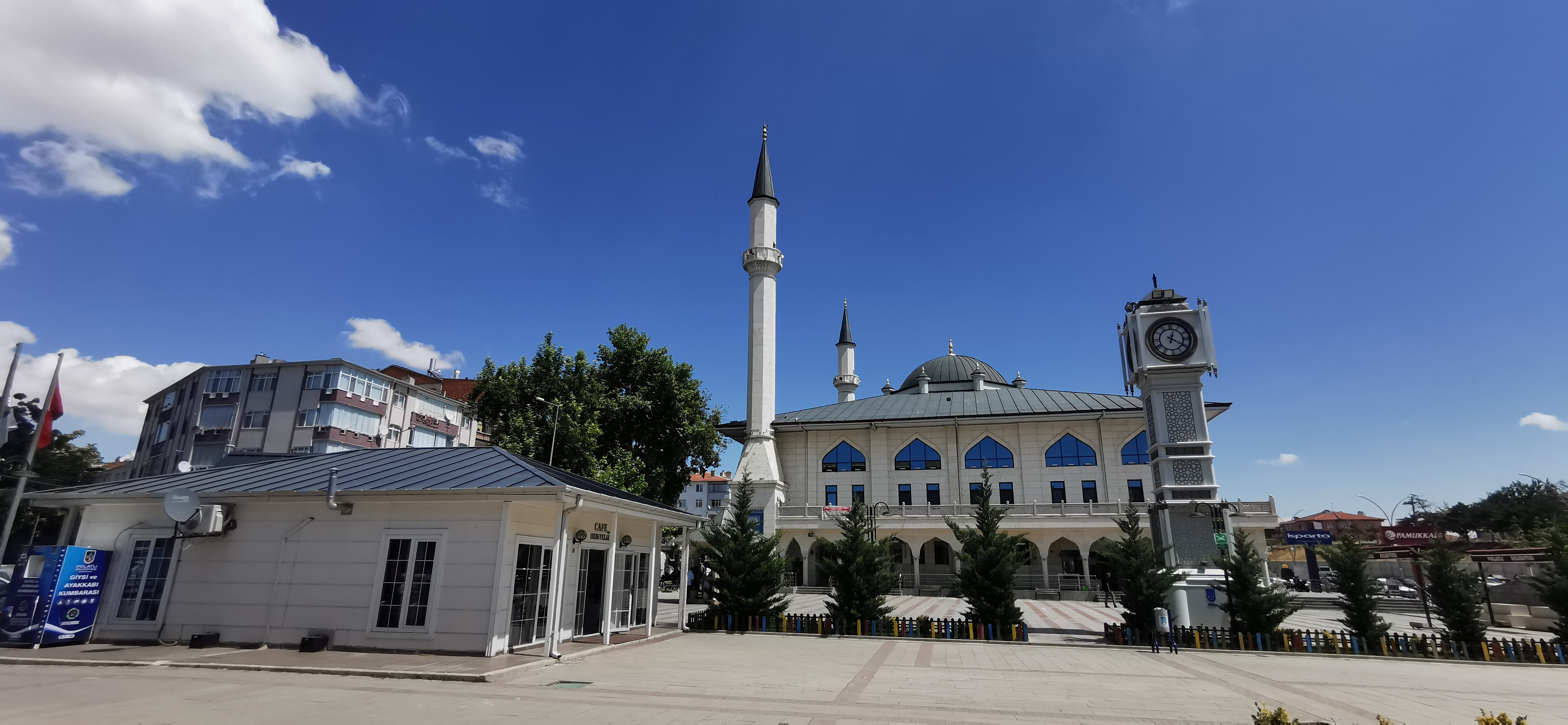
Battle of Sakarya National Historic Park, Polatlı-Haymana, Ankara.

=== Classical antiquity ===
On his expedition to the east, Alexander the Great cut the famous Gordian Knot, an omen of his coming rule over the whole Asia. Pessinus, an ancient city on the upper river Sangarios (modern day Sakarya River), is also within the borders of Polatlı. The mythological Phrygian King Midas is said to have ruled from Pessinus and to be buried here.

Polatlı also occupied an important place in the Greco-Turkish War of 1919-1922 as the Battle of Sakarya (August 23-September 13, 1921) was fought here, the utmost eastern point reached by the advancing Greek Army in Anatolia. There are two memorial burial grounds of those lost in the battle. There is also a monument named Mehmetçik Monument about the battle just 6 kilometres (3.7 mi) west of Polatlı.

== Hacıtuğrul mound ==
Since the 1970s, excavations by Turkish archaeologists have been carried out near the modern town and train station of Yenidoğan, Polatlı, 15 km northeast of Polatli and 20 km from Gordion. This site, near Hacıtuğrul, is now known as tr:Hacıtuğrul Höyüğü. The remains of monumental fortifications and other buildings of the city from Phrygian times, which exceeded Gordion in size, were found here. Five burial mounds were found in the vicinity.

== Composition ==
There are 95 neighbourhoods in Polatlı District:

- Adatoprakpınar
- Avdanlı
- Avşar
- Babayakup
- Basrı
- Beşköprü
- Beyceğiz
- Beylikköprü
- Çamlıca
- Çanakçı
- Çekirdeksiz
- Çimenceğiz
- Cumhuriyet
- Esentepe
- Eskikarsak
- Eskiköseler
- Eskipolatlı
- Fatih
- Gazi
- Gedikli
- Gençali
- Gülpınar
- Gülveren
- Gümüşyaka
- Gündoğan
- Güreş
- Hacımusa
- Hacımuslu
- Hacıosmanoğlu
- Hacıtuğrul
- Hıdırşeyh
- İğciler
- Ilıca
- İnler
- İstiklal
- Kabakköy
- Karaahmet
- Karabenli
- Karacaahmet
- Karahamzalı
- Karailyas
- Karakaya
- Karakuyu
- Karapınar
- Karayavşan
- Kargalı
- Kayabaşı
- Kıranharmanı
- Kızılcakışla
- Kocahacılı
- Kurtuluş
- Kuşcu
- Macun
- Mehmetakif
- Müslüm
- Oğuzlar
- Olukpınar
- Ömerler
- Ördekgölü
- Özyurt
- Poyraz
- Sabanca
- Şabanözü
- Sakarya
- Sarıhalil
- Sarıoba
- Sazlar
- Şehitlik
- Şentepe
- Şeyhali
- Şıhahmetli
- Sinanlı
- Sincik
- Sivri
- Taşpınar
- Tatlıkuyu
- Toydemir
- Tüfekçioğlu
- Türkkarsak
- Türktaciri
- Üçpınar
- Uzunbey
- Yağcıoğlu
- Yağmurbaba
- Yaralı
- Yassıhüyük
- Yeni
- Yenice
- Yenidoğan
- Yeniköseler
- Yenimehmetli
- Yeşilöz
- Yıldızlı
- Yüzükbaşı
- Zafer

== Polatlı today ==
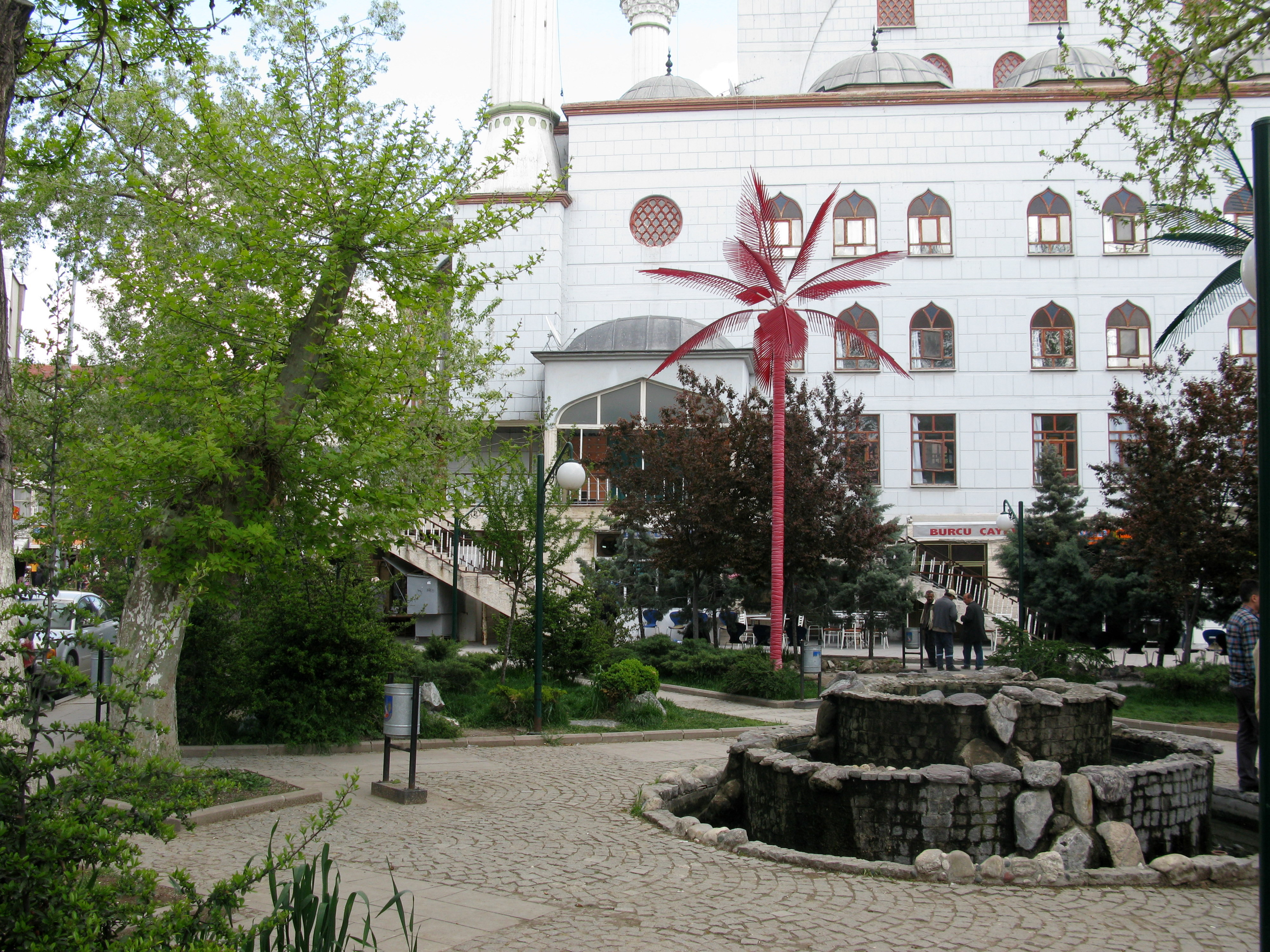
City centre of Polatlı

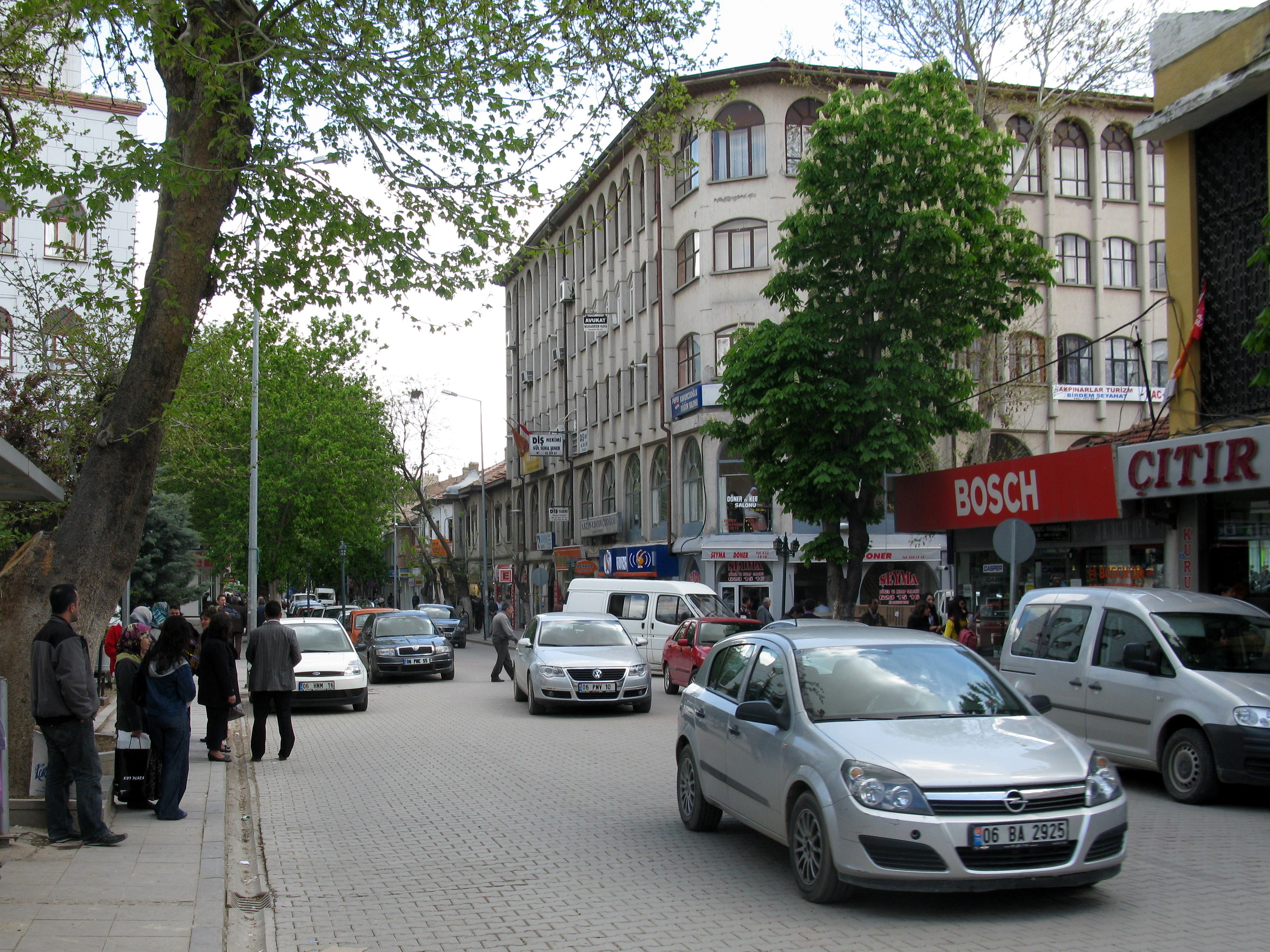
Ankara cd. city centre of Polatlı

Today, Polatlı is an important district of Ankara on the main road which connects the capital to the west of Turkey. The city has a good range of restaurants, bars, schools and other important amenities but still a quiet rural feel to it, and little social life except cafes, patisseries and window shopping on a Sunday afternoon. There are car repair workshops but otherwise little industry. Polatlı is trying to become an independent province from Ankara and "we want to be a city" graffiti can be seen in the town.

There is a military base here and the Turkish Army Artillery School was established in Polatlı in the early 1940s and is still an important institution in the town.

Polatlıspor is a minor league football club that once climbed into the second league.

There is a large statue of a kangaroo on the main road into city.

=== Longwave transmitter ===
Near Polatli, there is a longwave broadcasting transmitter, which works on 180 kHz with a transmitter output power of 1200 kW. It uses as antenna a single 250 metres tall mast situated at 39°45'22"N 32°25'5"E. The station is known as "Polatlı Vericisi."
