= State road D.200 (Turkey) =

D.200

Route information
- Part of E90 / AH1 / AH87
- Length: 1,261 km (784 mi)

Major junctions
- West end: Çanakkale (Dardanelles strait) D.550

- East end: west of Refahiye (Erzincan Province) D.100

Location
- Country: Turkey

Highway system
- Highways in Turkey; Motorways; List; State Highways; List

D.200 is a west-to-east state road in Turkey. It starts at Çanakkale at Dardanelles strait, extending D-550, and ends 10 km (6.2 mi) west of Refahiye, Erzincan Province as it merges into D-100. Since it runs all the way from west to east it crosses some north-to-south state roads, such as D-555, D-565, D-575, D-160, D-650, D-675, D-260, D-750, D-765, D-785, D-795, D-805, D-850 and D-865.

== Itinerary ==
Province	Location	Distance from Çanakkale (km)	Distance from Çanakkale (mile)	Distance from Refahiye (km)	Distance from Refahiye (mile)
Çanakkale	Çanakkale	0	0	1261	784
Balıkesir	Bandırma	166	103	1095	681
Bursa	Karacabey	209	130	1052	654
Bursa	Bursa	278	173	983	611
Bursa	İnegöl	323	201	938	583
Bilecik	Bozüyük	382	238	879	546
Eskişehir	Eskişehir	427	265	834	519
Ankara	Polatlı	583	362	678	422
Ankara	Ankara	660	410	601	374
Ankara	Elmadağ	701	436	560	348
Kırıkkale	Kırıkkale	731	454	530	330
Kırıkkale	Balışeyh	752	468	509	316
Yozgat	Yozgat	872	542	389	242
Yozgat	Sorgun	906	563	355	221
Sivas	Yıldızeli	1050	653	211	131
Sivas	Sivas	1096	681	165	103
Erzincan	west of Refahiye	1261	784	0	0
