= Acmon =

Name of several individuals in Greek mythology

There are several characters named Acmon or Akmon (Ancient Greek: Ἄκμων, lit. 'anvil') in Greek mythology:

- Acmon, one of the mythical race of Dactyls.
- Acmon, a Phrygian king who gave his name to the district known as Acmonia.
- Acmon, a mischievous forest creature who lived in Thermopylae or on Euboea but roamed the world and might turn up anywhere mischief was afoot.
- Acmon, a companion of Diomedes in Italy. He was turned into a bird.
- Acmon, the Aenead, son of Clytius (son of Aeolus), a friend of Aeneas in Roman mythology. Together with his father, they followed Aeneas in his exile after the fall of Troy.
- Acmon, in some sources the father of Uranus (the personification of the sky).
