= Phrygia =

Ancient Anatolian kingdom

Coordinates: 39°N 31°E

Kingdom of Phrygia
- 1200–675 BC
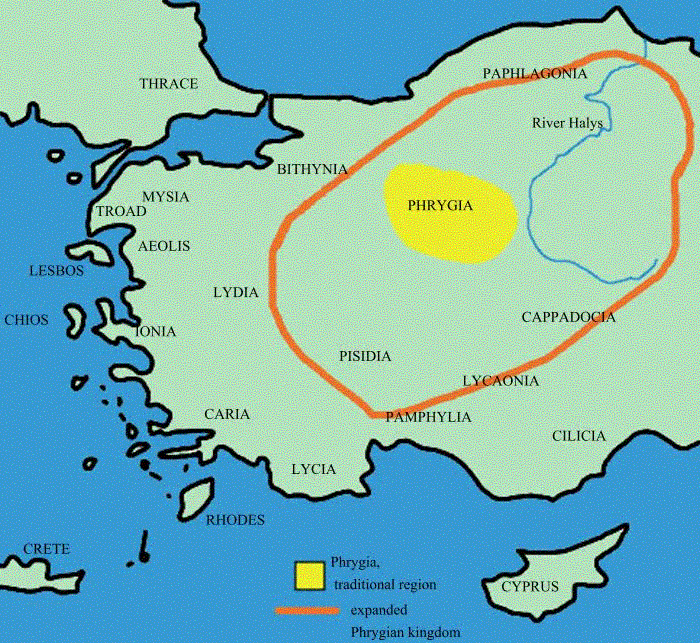
- Map of the Phrygian Kingdom at its greatest extent, c. 700 BC.
- Capital: Gordion
- Common languages: Phrygian
- Religion: Phrygian religion
- Government: Monarchy
- Kings (Note: balén)
  - 8th Century–740 BC: Gordias
  - 740–675 BC: Midas
- Historical era: Iron Age
  - Bronze Age Collapse: 1200 BC
  - Fall to the Cimmerians: 675 BC
Preceded by
Bryges
Mushki
Hittites
Succeeded by
Cimmerians
Lydia

In classical antiquity, Phrygia (/ˈfrɪdʒiə/ FRIJ-ee-ə; Ancient Greek: Φρυγία, Phrygía) was a civilization and kingdom in the west-central part of Anatolia, in what is now Asian Turkey, centered on the Sangarios River.

Stories of the heroic age of Greek mythology tell of several legendary Phrygian kings:

- Gordias, whose Gordian Knot would later be cut by Alexander the Great;
- Midas, who turned whatever he touched to gold;
- Mygdon, who warred with the Amazons.

According to Homer's Iliad, the Phrygians participated in the Trojan War as close allies of the Trojans, fighting against the Achaeans. Phrygian power reached its peak in the late 8th century BC under another historical king, Midas, who dominated most of western and central Anatolia and rivaled Assyria and Urartu for power in eastern Anatolia. This later Midas was, however, also the last independent king of Phrygia before Cimmerians sacked the Phrygian capital, Gordium, around 695 BC. Phrygia then became subject to Lydia, and then successively to Persia, Alexander and his Hellenistic successors, the Seleucid Empire, Pergamon, the Roman Empire and the Byzantine Empire. Over this time Phrygians became Christian and Greek-speaking, assimilating into the Byzantine state; after the Turkish conquest of Byzantine Anatolia in the late Middle Ages, the name "Phrygia" passed out of usage as a territorial designation.

== Geography ==
Location of Phrygia in Anatolia

Phrygia describes an area on the western end of the high Anatolian plateau, an arid region quite unlike the forested lands to the north and west of it. Phrygia begins in the northwest where an area of dry steppe is diluted by the Sakarya and Porsuk river system and is home to the settlements of Dorylaeum near modern Eskişehir, and the Phrygian capital Gordion. The climate is harsh with hot summers and cold winters. Therefore, olives will not easily grow here so the land is mostly used for livestock grazing and barley production.

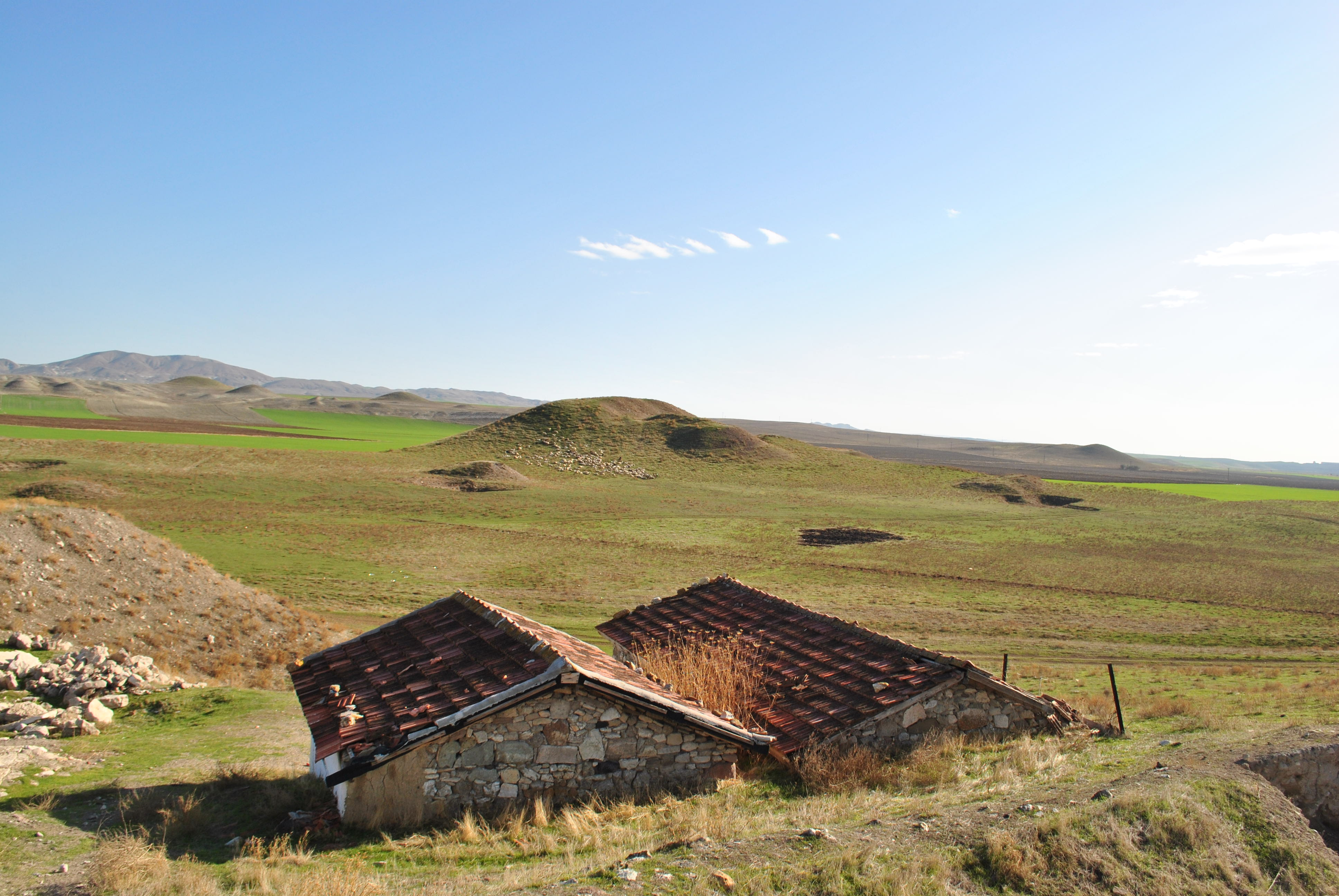
Gordion archeological site

South of Dorylaeum an important Phrygian settlement, Midas City (Yazılıkaya, Eskişehir), is situated in an area of hills and columns of volcanic tuff. To the south again, central Phrygia includes the cities of Afyonkarahisar (ancient Akroinon) with its marble quarries at nearby Docimium (İscehisar), and the town of Synnada. At the western end of Phrygia stood the towns of Aizanoi (modern Çavdarhisar) and Acmonia. From here to the southwest lies the hilly area of Phrygia that contrasts to the bare plains of the region's heartland.

The region of southwestern Phrygia is irrigated by the Maeander, also known as the Büyük Menderes River, along with its tributary, the Lycus. Within its boundaries lie the towns of Laodicea on the Lycus and Hierapolis.

== Origins ==
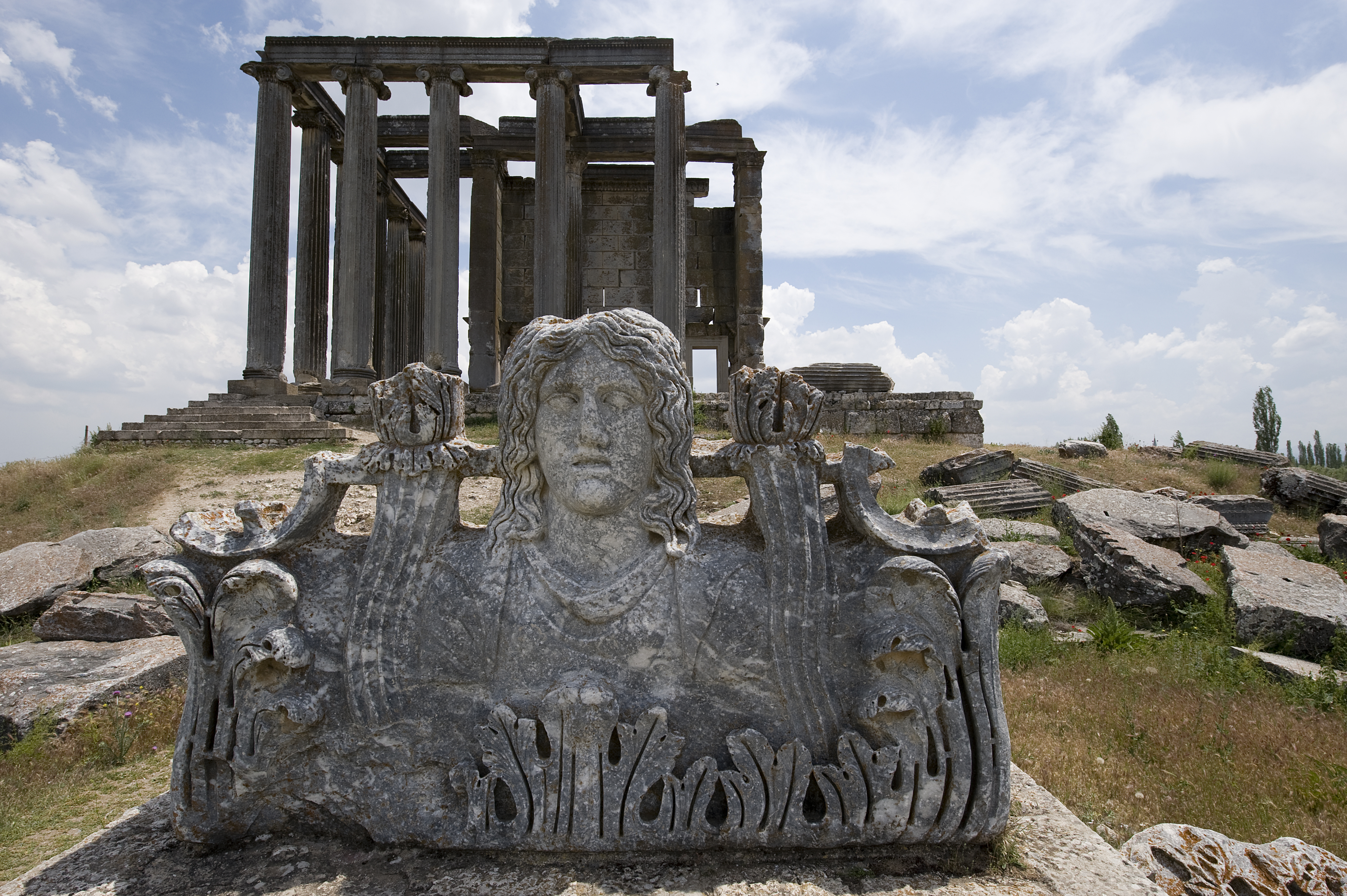
Zeus Temple in ancient city of Aizanoi belongs to Phrygia. It is a UNESCO World Heritage Site

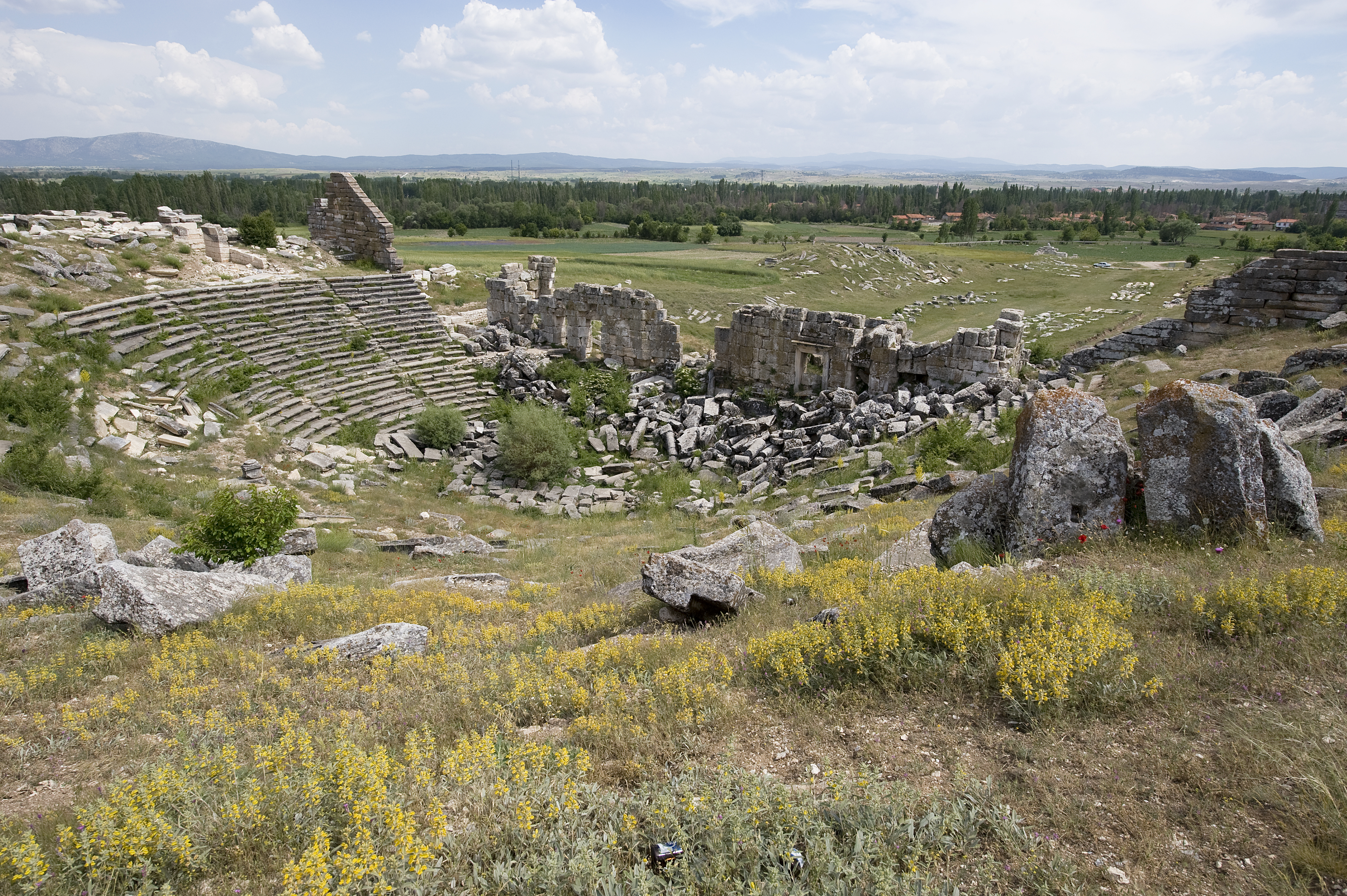
Theatre complex of Aizanoi in Phrygia

=== Legendary ancient migrations ===
According to ancient tradition among Greek historians, the Phrygians migrated to Anatolia from the Balkans. Herodotus says that the Phrygians were called Bryges when they lived in Europe. He and other Greek writers also recorded legends about King Midas that associated him with or put his origin in Macedonia; Herodotus, for example, says a wild rose garden in Macedonia was named after Midas.

Some classical writers also connected the Phrygians with the Mygdones, the name of two groups of people, one of which lived in northern Macedonia and another in Mysia. Likewise, the Phrygians have been identified with the Bebryces, a people said to have warred with Mysia before the Trojan War and who had a king named Mygdon at roughly the same time as the Phrygians were said to have had a king named Mygdon.

The classical historian Strabo groups Phrygians, Mygdones, Mysians, Bebryces and Bithynians together as peoples that migrated to Anatolia from the Balkans. This image of Phrygians as part of a related group of northwest Anatolian cultures seems the most likely explanation for the confusion over whether Phrygians, Bebryces and Anatolian Mygdones were or were not the same people.

=== Phrygian language ===
Phrygian continued to be spoken until the 6th century AD, though its distinctive alphabet was lost earlier than those of most Anatolian cultures. One of the Homeric Hymns describes the Phrygian language as not mutually intelligible with that of Troy, and inscriptions found at Gordium make clear that Phrygians spoke an Indo-European language with at least some vocabulary similar to Greek. Phrygian clearly did not belong to the family of Anatolian languages spoken in most of the adjacent countries, such as Hittite. The apparent similarity of the Phrygian language to Greek and its dissimilarity with the Anatolian languages spoken by most of their neighbors is also taken as support for a European origin of the Phrygians.

From what is available, it is evident that Phrygian shares important features with Greek and Armenian. Phrygian is part of the centum group of Indo-European languages. However, between the 19th and the first half of the 20th century Phrygian was mostly considered a satəm language, and thus closer to Armenian and Thracian, while today it is commonly considered to be a centum language and thus closer to Greek. The reason that in the past Phrygian had the guise of a satəm language was due to two secondary processes that affected it. Namely, Phrygian merged the old labiovelar with the plain velar, and secondly, when in contact with palatal vowels /e/ and /i/, especially in initial position, some consonants became palatalized. Furthermore, Kortlandt (1988) presented common sound changes of Thracian and Armenian and their separation from Phrygian and the rest of the palaeo-Balkan languages from an early stage.

Modern consensus regards Greek as the closest relative of Phrygian, a position that is supported by Brixhe, Neumann, Matzinger, Woodhouse, Ligorio, Lubotsky, and Obrador-Cursach. Furthermore, 34 out of the 36 Phrygian isoglosses that are recorded are shared with Greek, with 22 being exclusive between them. The last 50 years of Phrygian scholarship developed a hypothesis that proposes a proto-Graeco-Phrygian stage out of which Greek and Phrygian originated, and if Phrygian was more sufficiently attested, that stage could perhaps be reconstructed.

=== Recent migration hypotheses ===
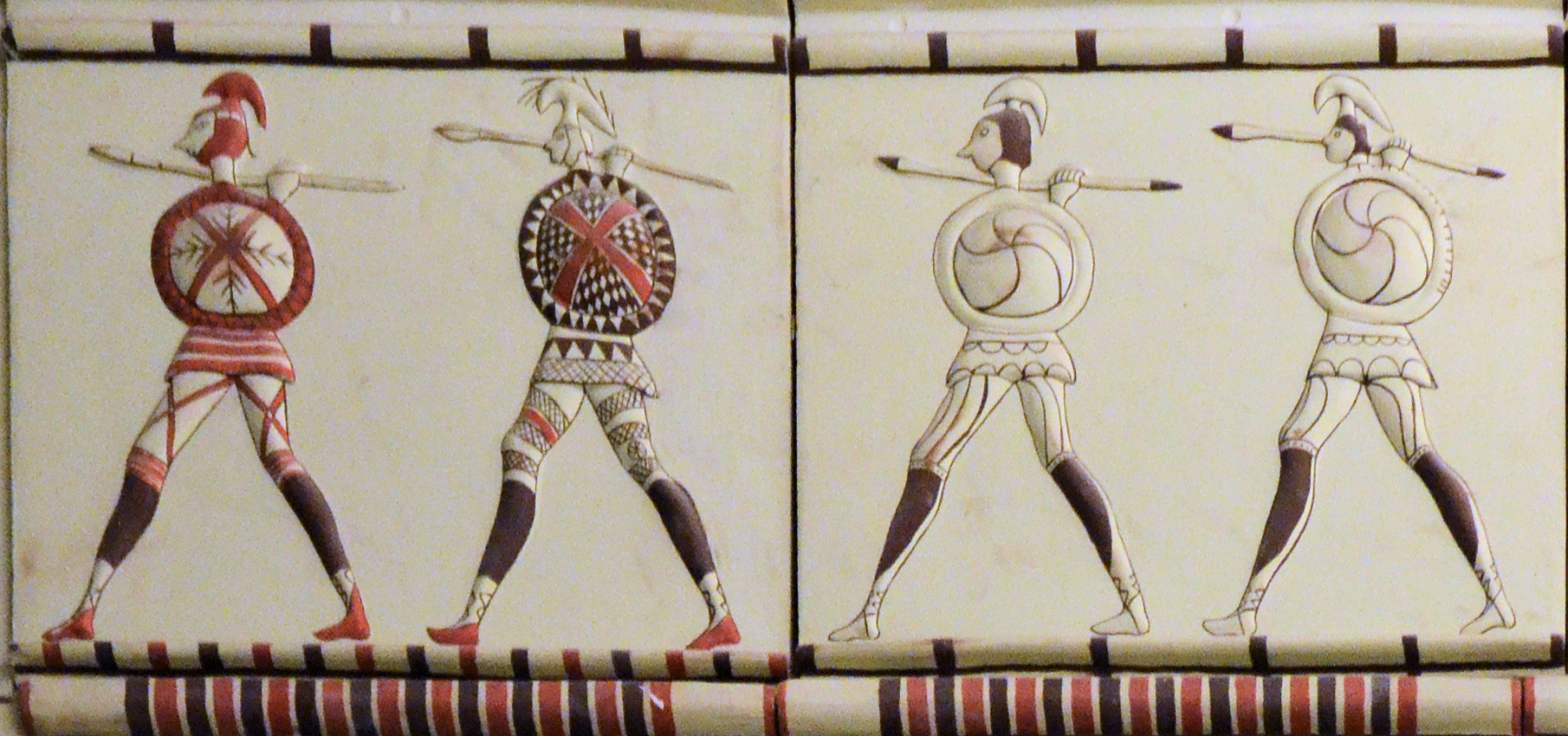
Phrygian soldiers. Detail from a reconstruction of a Phrygian building at Pazarlı, Çorum, Turkey, 7th–6th centuries BC.

Some scholars dismiss the claim of a Phrygian migration as a mere legend, likely arising from the coincidental similarity of their name to the Bryges, and have theorized that migration into Phrygia could have occurred more recently than classical sources suggest. They have sought to fit the Phrygian arrival into a narrative explaining the downfall of the Hittite Empire and the end of the high Bronze Age in Anatolia.

According to the "recent migration" theory, the Phrygians invaded just before or after the collapse of the Hittite Empire at the beginning of the 12th century BC, filling the political vacuum in central-western Anatolia, and may have been counted among the "Sea Peoples" that Egyptian records credit with bringing about the Hittite collapse. The so-called Handmade Knobbed Ware found in Western Anatolia during this period has been tentatively identified as an import connected to this invasion.

=== Relation to their Hittite predecessors ===
Some scholars believe that the Phrygians were already established on the Sakarya River during the Late Bronze Age. These scholars seek instead to trace the Phrygians' origins among the many nations of western Anatolia who were subject to the Hittites. This interpretation finds some motivation in Greek legends about Phrygians participation in the Trojan War, as well as the founding myth of the Gordium.

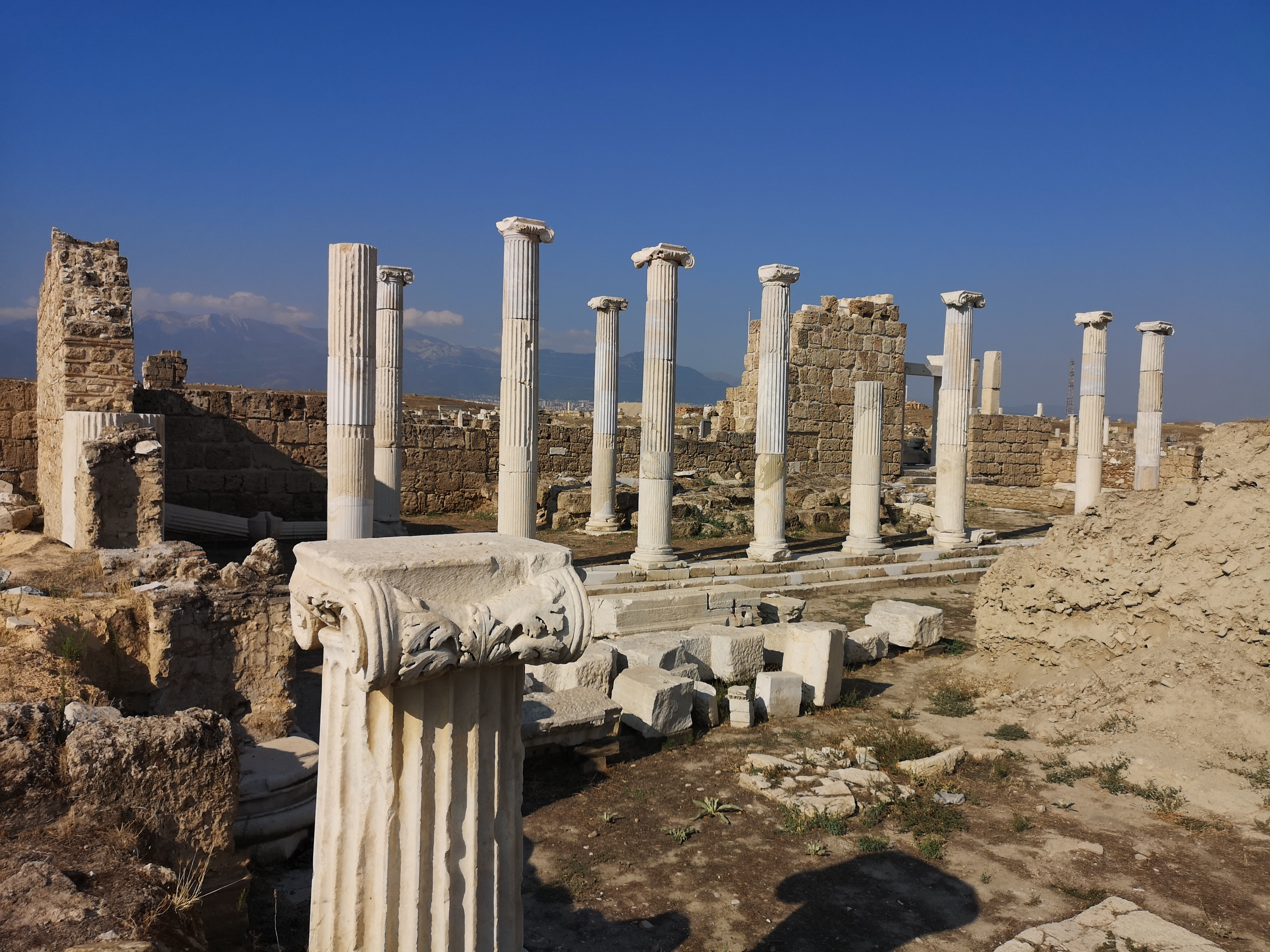
Ruins of Laodicea on the Lycus

No one has conclusively identified which of the many subjects of the Hittites might have represented early Phrygians. According to a classical tradition, popularized by Josephus, Phrygia can be equated with the country called Togarmah by the ancient Hebrews, which has in turn been identified as the Tegarama of Hittite texts and Til-Garimmu of Assyrian records. Josephus called Togarmah "the Thrugrammeans, who, as the Greeks resolved, were named Phrygians". However, the Greek source cited by Josephus is unknown, and it is unclear if there was any basis for the identification other than name similarity.

Scholars of the Hittites believe Tegarama was in eastern Anatolia – some locate it at Gurun – far to the east of Phrygia. Some scholars have identified Phrygia with the Assuwa league, and noted that the Iliad mentions a Phrygian (Queen Hecuba's brother) named Asios. Another possible early name of Phrygia could be Hapalla, the name of the easternmost province that emerged from the splintering of the Bronze Age western Anatolian empire Arzawa. However, scholars are unsure if Hapalla corresponds to Phrygia or to Pisidia, further south.

=== Relation to Armenians ===
Ancient Greek historian Herodotus (writing circa 440 BC), suggested that Armenians migrated from Phrygia, which at the time encompassed much of western and central Anatolia: "the Armenians were equipped like Phrygians, being Phrygian colonists" (7.73) (Ἀρμένιοι δὲ κατά περ Φρύγες ἐσεσάχατο, ἐόντες Φρυγῶν ἄποικοι.) According to Herotodus, the Phrygians had originated in the Balkans, in an area adjoining Macedonia, from where they had emigrated to Anatolia during the Bronze Age collapse. This led later scholars, such as Igor Diakonoff, to theorize that Armenians also originated in the Balkans and moved east with the Phrygians. However, an Armenian origin in the Balkans, although once widely accepted, has been facing increased scrutiny in recent years due to discrepancies in the timeline and lack of genetic and archeological evidence. In fact, some scholars have suggested that the Phrygians and/or the apparently related Mushki people were originally from Armenia and moved westward.

A number of linguists have rejected a close relationship between Armenian and Phrygian, despite saying that the two languages do share some features. Phrygian is now classified as a centum language more closely related to Greek than Armenian, whereas Armenian is mostly satem.

== History ==
=== Peak and destruction of the Phrygian kingdom ===
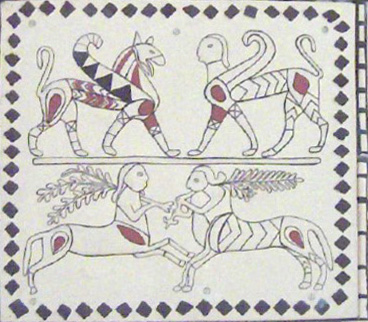
Detail from a reconstruction of a Phrygian building at Pararli, Turkey, 7th–6th centuries BC: Museum of Anatolian Civilisations, Ankara. A griffin, sphinx and two centaurs are shown.

During the 8th century BC, the Phrygian kingdom with its capital at Gordium in the upper Sakarya River valley expanded into an empire dominating most of central and western Anatolia and bordering the larger and more powerful Neo-Assyrian Empire to its southeast and the kingdom of Urartu to the northeast.

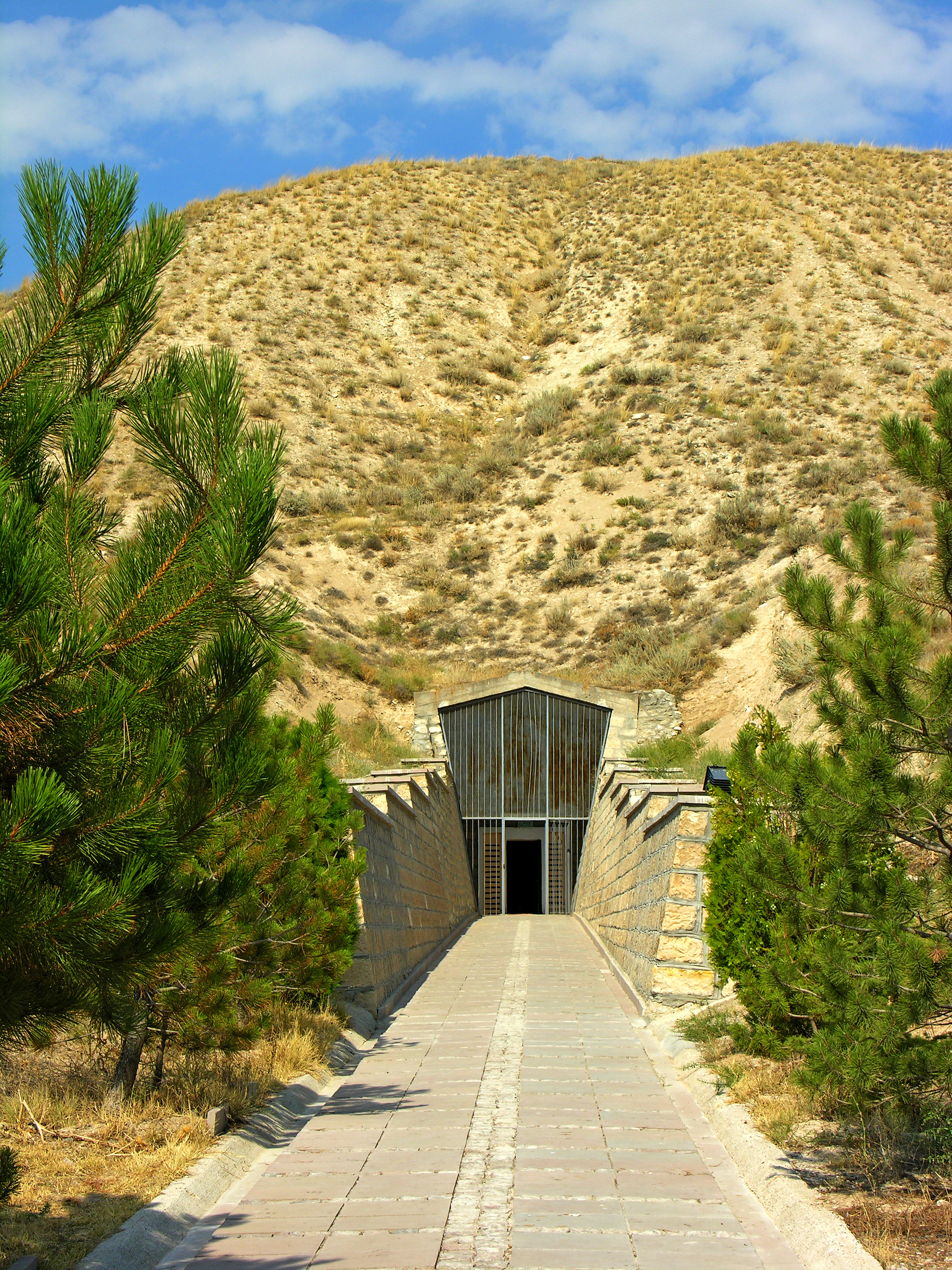
The Midas Mound Tumulus at Gordion, dated c. 740 BC

According to the classical historians Strabo, Eusebius and Julius Africanus, the king of Phrygia during this time was another Midas. This historical Midas is believed to be the same person named as Mita in Assyrian texts from the period and identified as king of the Mushki. Scholars believe that the Assyrians called Phrygians "Mushki" because the Phrygians and Mushki, an eastern Anatolian people, were at that time campaigning in a joint army against Assyria. This Midas is thought to have reigned over Phrygia at the peak of its power from about 720 BC to about 695 BC (according to Eusebius) or 676 BC (according to Julius Africanus). Phrygia engaged in military conflict with Assyria from 715 BC with both vying for control of Neo-Hittite lands in central Anatolia that Assyria regarded as its territory. An Assyrian inscription mentioning "Mita", dated to 709 BC, during the reign of Sargon of Assyria, suggests Phrygia had offered its submission and struck a truce by that time. This Midas appears to have had good relations and close trade ties with the Greeks, and reputedly married an Aeolian Greek princess.

A system of writing in the Phrygian language developed and flourished in Gordium during this period, using a Phoenician-derived alphabet similar to the Greek one. A distinctive Phrygian pottery called Polished Ware appears during this period.

However, the Phrygian Kingdom was then overwhelmed by Cimmerian invaders, and Gordium was sacked and destroyed. According to Strabo and others, Midas committed suicide by drinking bulls' blood.

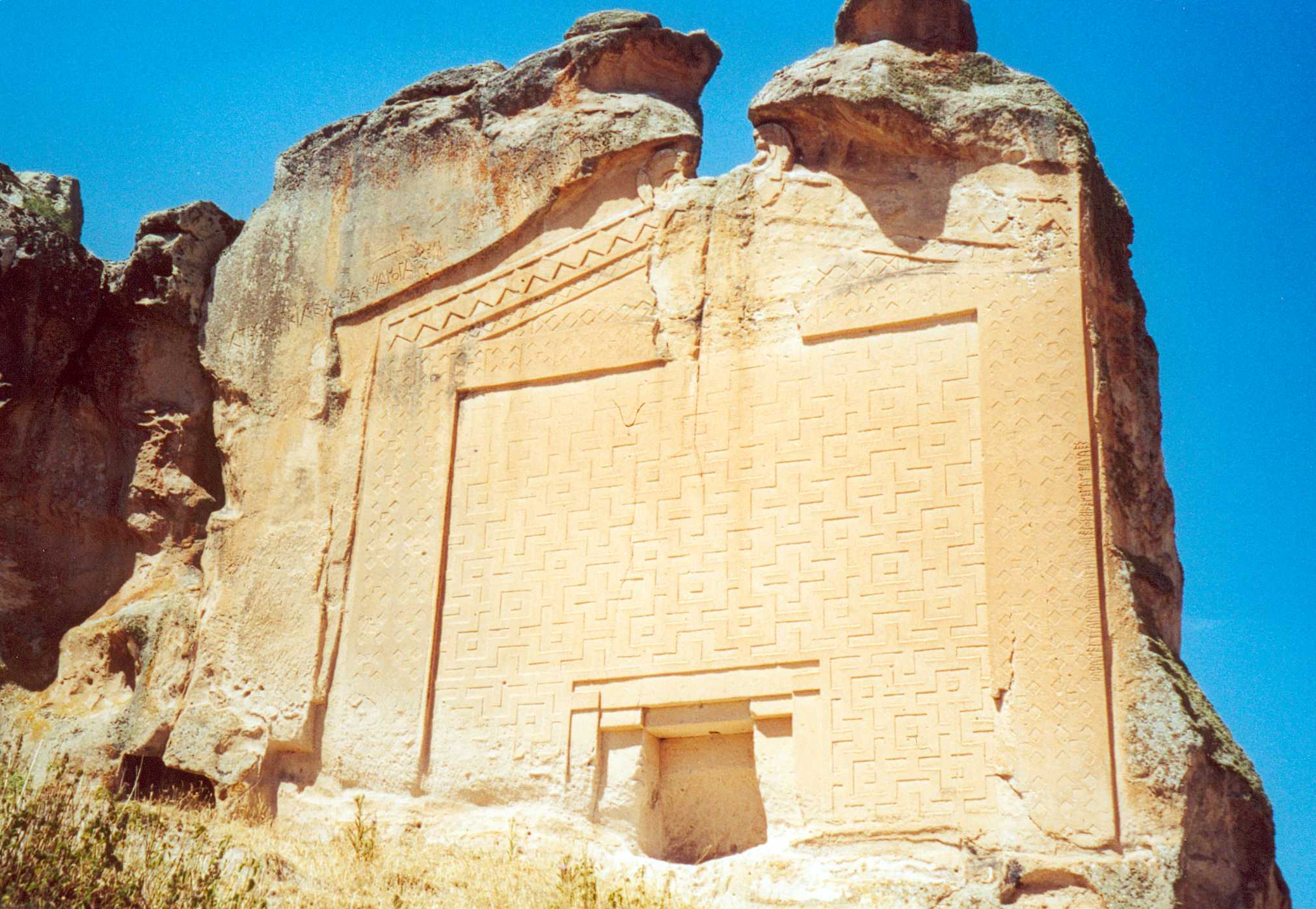
Tomb at Midas City (6th century BC), near Eskişehir

A series of digs have opened Gordium as one of Turkey's most revealing archeological sites. Excavations confirm a violent destruction of Gordium around 675 BC. A tomb from the period, popularly identified as the "Tomb of Midas", revealed a wooden structure deeply buried under a vast tumulus, containing grave goods, a coffin, furniture, and food offerings (Archaeological Museum, Ankara).

=== As a Lydian province ===
After their destruction of Gordium, the Cimmerians remained in western Anatolia, made attempts to encroach on Assyrian ruled territory which met with defeat, and warred with Lydia, which eventually expelled them by around 620 BC, and then expanded to incorporate much of Phrygia, which became the Lydian empire's eastern frontier, while the Assyrians incorporated some hitherto eastern Phrygian territory. The Gordium site reveals a considerable building program during the 6th century BC, under the domination of Lydian kings including the proverbially rich King Croesus. Meanwhile, Phrygia's former eastern subjects fell to Assyria and later to the Medes and Persians.

There may be an echo of strife with Lydia and perhaps a veiled reference to royal hostages, in the legend of the twice-unlucky Phrygian prince Adrastus, who accidentally killed his brother and exiled himself to Lydia, where King Croesus welcomed him. Once again, Adrastus accidentally killed Croesus' son and then committed suicide.

=== As Persian province(s) ===
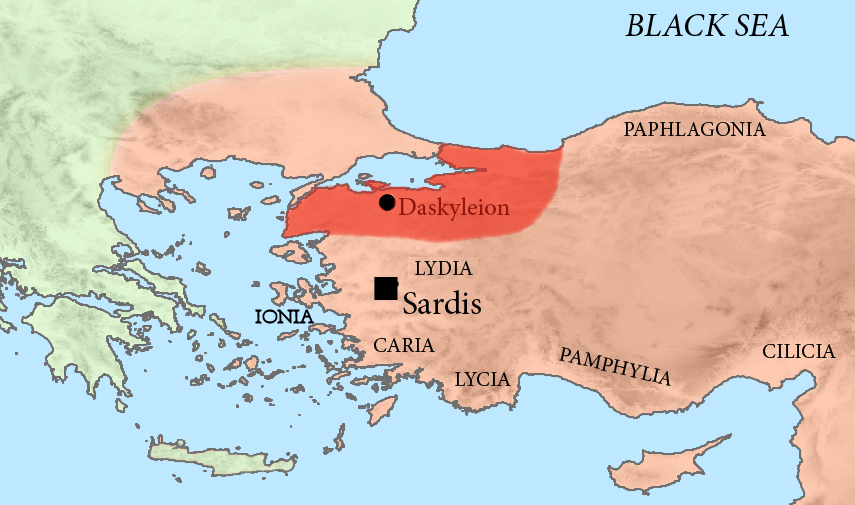
The location of Hellespontine Phrygia, and the provincial capital of Dascylium, in the Achaemenid Empire, c. 500 BC.

Some time in the 540s BC, Phrygia passed to the Achaemenid (Great Persian) Empire when Cyrus the Great conquered Lydia.

After Darius the Great became Persian Emperor in 521 BC, he remade the ancient trade route into the Persian "Royal Road" and instituted administrative reforms that included setting up satrapies. The Phrygian satrapy (province) lay west of the Halys River (now Kızıl River) and east of Mysia and Lydia. Its capital was established at Dascylium, modern Ergili.

In the course of the 5th century, the region was divided in two administrative satrapies: Hellespontine Phrygia and Greater Phrygia.

=== Under Alexander and his successors ===
The Macedonian Greek conqueror Alexander the Great passed through Gordium in 333 BC and severed the Gordian Knot in the temple of Sabazios ("Zeus"). According to a legend, possibly promulgated by Alexander's publicists, whoever untied the knot would be master of Asia. With Gordium sited on the Persian Royal Road that led through the heart of Anatolia, the prophecy had some geographical plausibility. With Alexander, Phrygia became part of the wider Hellenistic world. Upon Alexander's death in 323 BC, the Battle of Ipsus took place in 301 BC.

=== Celts and Attalids ===
In the chaotic period after Alexander's death, northern Phrygia was overrun by Celts, eventually to become the province of Galatia. The former capital of Gordium was captured and destroyed by the Gauls soon afterwards and disappeared from history.

In 188 BC, the southern remnant of Phrygia came under the control of the Attalids of Pergamon. However, the Phrygian language survived, although now written in the Greek alphabet.

=== Rome and Byzantium ===
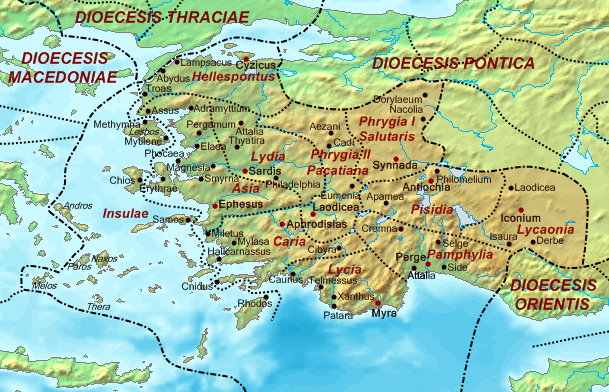
The two Phrygian provinces within the Diocese of Asia, c. 400 AD.

In 133 BC, the remnants of Phrygia passed to Rome. For purposes of provincial administration, the Romans maintained a divided Phrygia, attaching the northeastern part to the province of Galatia and the western portion to the province of Asia. There is some evidence that western Phrygia and Caria were separated from Asia in 254–259 to become the new province of Phrygia and Caria. During the reforms of Diocletian, Phrygia was divided anew into two provinces: "Phrygia I", or Phrygia Salutaris (meaning "healthy" in Latin), and Phrygia II, or Pacatiana (Greek Πακατιανή, Pakatiane, unknown etymology, but translated as "peaceful"), both under the Diocese of Asia. Salutaris with Synnada as its capital comprised the eastern portion of the region and Pacatiana with Laodicea on the Lycus as capital of the western portion. The provinces survived up to the end of the 7th century, when they were replaced by the Theme system. In the Late Roman, early "Byzantine" period, most of Phrygia belonged to the Anatolic theme. It was overrun by the Turks in the aftermath of the Battle of Manzikert (1071). The Turks had taken complete control in the 13th century, but the ancient name of Phrygia remained in use until the last remnant of the Byzantine Empire was conquered by the Ottoman Empire in 1453.

== Culture ==
=== Religion ===
The Phrygian religion in antiquity was polytheistic and was distinct from the earlier religions of the Anatolian peoples and whose pantheon was composed of deities who were reflexes of earlier Aegean-Balkan ones.

==== Matar Kubeleya ====
Unlike the Hittite and Luwian religions, the Phrygian pantheon was headed by a feminine deity, a goddess Matar who was associated with mountains and wild animals and was given the epithet of Kubeleya or Kubileya with the full name Matar Kubeleya thus meaning lit. 'Mother of the Mountain Peaks'. As the "Mountain Mother" (Ancient Greek: Μητηρ ορεια, romanized: Mētēr oreia), Matar was the mistress of wild mountainous landscapes and the protectress and nurturer of the wild animals living there. Mount Agdistis (and its daimon, the hermaphroditic deity Agdistis) was sacred to Cybele as well as her consort, Attis.

Matar Kubeleya was the Phrygian reflex of an earlier Aegean-Balkan goddess whose Lydian variant was the goddess Kufaws.

The cult of Matar Kubeleya was performed by priests named Corybantes (meaning lit. 'head-shakers'), likely in mountainous locations, and through orgiastic rites featuring pipe and cymbal music and ecstatic dancing, with her name also characterising her as the goddess of head-shaking and the ecstatic state caused by it. Therefore, the goddess was also given a Phrygian epithet meaning "frantic" in reference to the divine frenzy she inspired in her worshipers and recorded in Greek as kubēbos (κυβηβος).

Due to the prominence of the cult of Matar Kubeleya in Central Anatolia during the Iron Age, her cult spread to Pisidia and later to the Greco-Roman world under the name of Kybele (Ancient Greek: Κυβέλη; Latin: Cybele).

==== Other deities ====
The worship and mythology of Cybele was deeply tied to that of Attis, her consort. She and Attis were also associated with the hermaphroditic Agdistis, daimon of their sacred mountain.

The storm god Tiws held an important place in the Phrygian pantheon and his cult was widespread in Phrygia. Tiws was not connected to the earlier Anatolian storm god Tarḫuntas and was instead the Phrygian variant of an earlier Aegean-Balkan god whose Lydian and Greek reflexes were Lefs and Zeus, also cognate with the Italic Jovis.

The Phrygian moon god was Mas who was known in Greek as Men. Mas was the Phrygian reflex of an earlier Aegean-Balkan god whose Lydian variant was Qaλiyañs.

The identity and gender of the Phrygian deity Bas are still unclear.

Artimis was a Potnia Theron-type Phrygian goddess who was the reflex of an older Aegean-Balkan goddess whose Lydian and Greek variants were respectively the goddesses Artimus and Artemis.

=== Music ===
The earliest traditions of Greek music derived from Phrygia, transmitted through the Greek colonies in Anatolia and included the Phrygian mode, which was considered to be the warlike mode in ancient Greek music. Phrygian music, especially the use of the Phrygian mode, was associated with a range of different moods and occasions, and often connected with various religious practices. Phrygian Midas, the king of the "golden touch", was tutored in music by Orpheus himself according to the myth. Another musical invention that came from Phrygia was the aulos, a reed instrument with two pipes.

Scholars have connected the Phrygian Mode with ecstatic rituals and other types of religious frenzy in Greek society, which expressed devotion and ecstasy. Among different forms and styles of music within the Greek culture, Phrygian music was generally not described as calm, elite and educational, and rather placed on the other end of the spectrum, emphasizing emotional intensity and ritual ecstasy, designed to produce emotional stimulation-and-release, with themes related to Dionysus, Cybele, Sabazios, etc. These emotionally intense music forms of Phrygia were strongly associated with the Phrygian mode, and in many cases, performed with percussion and pipe instruments, including the aulos.

Due to the close associations with ritual ecstasy in its music, Phrygia was long thought as the origin of high-arousal cults. However, more recent scholarship has concluded that archaeological evidence for Phrygia as the origin of ecstatic cults is extremely limited and likely inexistent. Instead, the origin of these cult activities is believed to be entirely Greek. The attribution to Phrygia as the origin of ecstatic cults was likely the product of Greek and Roman imagination and cognitive consonance, which treated Phrygia as foreign and oriental. This false belief was used as an act of relief by Greek elites, who felt discomforted about the emotionally intense ritual music, assigning the origin to a foreign and exotic people of Phrygia. Phrygia as a result, served as a symbolic homeland to ecstatic cults rather than an actual origin.

Phrygian music and the Phrygian mode proved influential in later European music practices, despite the debate over whether it was the origin of ecstatic cults. In later European music theories, especially during the Renaissance, the Phrygian mode served as a distinct music framework with unique structures and musical behaviors. It was used in various forms of music, including madrigals, motets, and sacred vocal polyphonies, expressing themes including tension, suffering, sexual tension, and devotion.

=== Phrygian cap ===
Classical Greek iconography identifies the Trojan Paris as non-Greek by his Phrygian cap, which was worn by Mithras and survived into modern imagery as the "liberty cap" of the American and French revolutionaries.

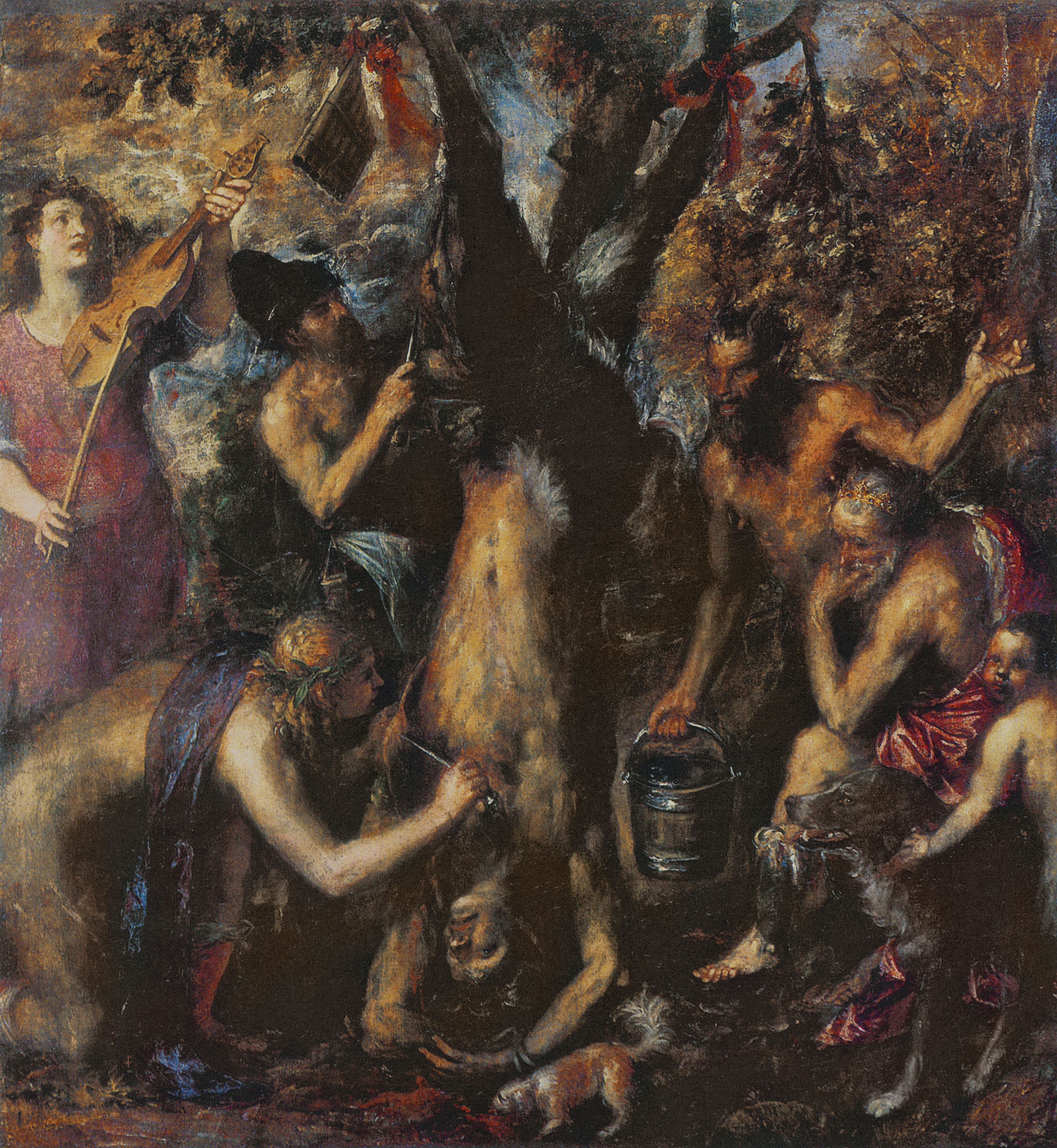
The Flaying of Marsyas by Titian, 1570s, with King Midas at right and the man with a knife in a Phrygian cap.

== Mythic past ==
The name of the earliest known mythical king was Nannacus (aka Annacus). This king resided at Iconium, the most eastern city of the kingdom of Phrygia at that time; and after his death, at the age of 300 years, a great flood overwhelmed the country, as had been foretold by an ancient oracle. The next king mentioned in extant classical sources was called Manis or Masdes. According to Plutarch, because of his splendid exploits, great things were called "manic" in Phrygia. Thereafter, the kingdom of Phrygia seems to have become fragmented among various kings. One of the kings was Tantalus, who ruled over the north western region of Phrygia around Mount Sipylus. Tantalus was endlessly punished in Tartarus, because he allegedly killed his son Pelops and sacrificially offered him to the Olympians, a reference to the suppression of human sacrifice. Tantalus was also falsely accused of stealing from the lotteries he had invented. In the mythic age before the Trojan War, during a time of an interregnum, Gordius (or Gordias), a Phrygian farmer, became king, fulfilling an oracular prophecy. The kingless Phrygians had turned for guidance to the oracle of Sabazios ("Zeus" to the Greeks) at Telmissus, in the part of Phrygia that later became part of Galatia. They had been instructed by the oracle to acclaim as their king the first man who rode up to the god's temple in a cart. That man was Gordias (Gordios, Gordius), a farmer, who dedicated the ox-cart in question, tied to its shaft with the "Gordian Knot". Gordias refounded a capital at Gordium in west central Anatolia, situated on the old trackway through the heart of Anatolia that became Darius's Persian "Royal Road" from Pessinus to Ancyra, and not far from the River Sangarius.

Man in Phrygian costume, Hellenistic period (3rd–1st century BC), Cyprus

The Phrygians are associated in Greek mythology with the Dactyls, minor gods credited with the invention of iron smelting, who in most versions of the legend lived at Mount Ida in Phrygia.

Gordias's son (adopted in some versions) was Midas. A large body of myths and legends surround this first king Midas. connecting him with a mythological tale concerning Attis. This shadowy figure resided at Pessinus and attempted to marry his daughter to the young Attis in spite of the opposition of his lover Agdestis and his mother, the goddess Cybele. When Agdestis and/or Cybele appear and cast madness upon the members of the wedding feast. Midas is said to have died in the ensuing chaos.

King Midas is said to have associated himself with Silenus and other satyrs and with Dionysus, who granted him a "golden touch".

In one version of his story, Midas travels from Thrace accompanied by a band of his people to Asia Minor to wash away the taint of his unwelcome "golden touch" in the river Pactolus. Leaving the gold in the river's sands, Midas found himself in Phrygia, where he was adopted by the childless king Gordias and taken under the protection of Cybele. Acting as the visible representative of Cybele, and under her authority, it would seem, a Phrygian king could designate his successor.

The Phrygian Sibyl was the priestess presiding over the Apollonian oracle at Phrygia.

According to Herodotus, the Egyptian pharaoh Psammetichus II had two children raised in isolation in order to find the original language. The children were reported to have uttered bekos, which is Phrygian for "bread", so Psammetichus admitted that the Phrygians were a nation older than the Egyptians.

In the Iliad, the homeland of the Phrygians was on the Sangarius River, which would remain the centre of Phrygia throughout its history. Phrygia was famous for its wine and had "brave and expert" horsemen.

According to the Iliad, before the Trojan War, a young king Priam of Troy had taken an army to Phrygia to support it in a war against the Amazons. Homer calls the Phrygians "the people of Otreus and godlike Mygdon". According to Euripides, Quintus Smyrnaeus and others, this Mygdon's son, Coroebus, fought and died in the Trojan War; he had sued for the hand of the Trojan princess Cassandra in marriage. The name Otreus could be an eponym for Otroea, a place on Lake Ascania in the vicinity of the later Nicaea, and the name Mygdon is clearly an eponym for the Mygdones, a people said by Strabo to live in northwest Asia Minor, and who appear to have sometimes been considered distinct from the Phrygians. However, Pausanias believed that Mygdon's tomb was located at Stectorium in the southern Phrygian highlands, near modern Sandikli.

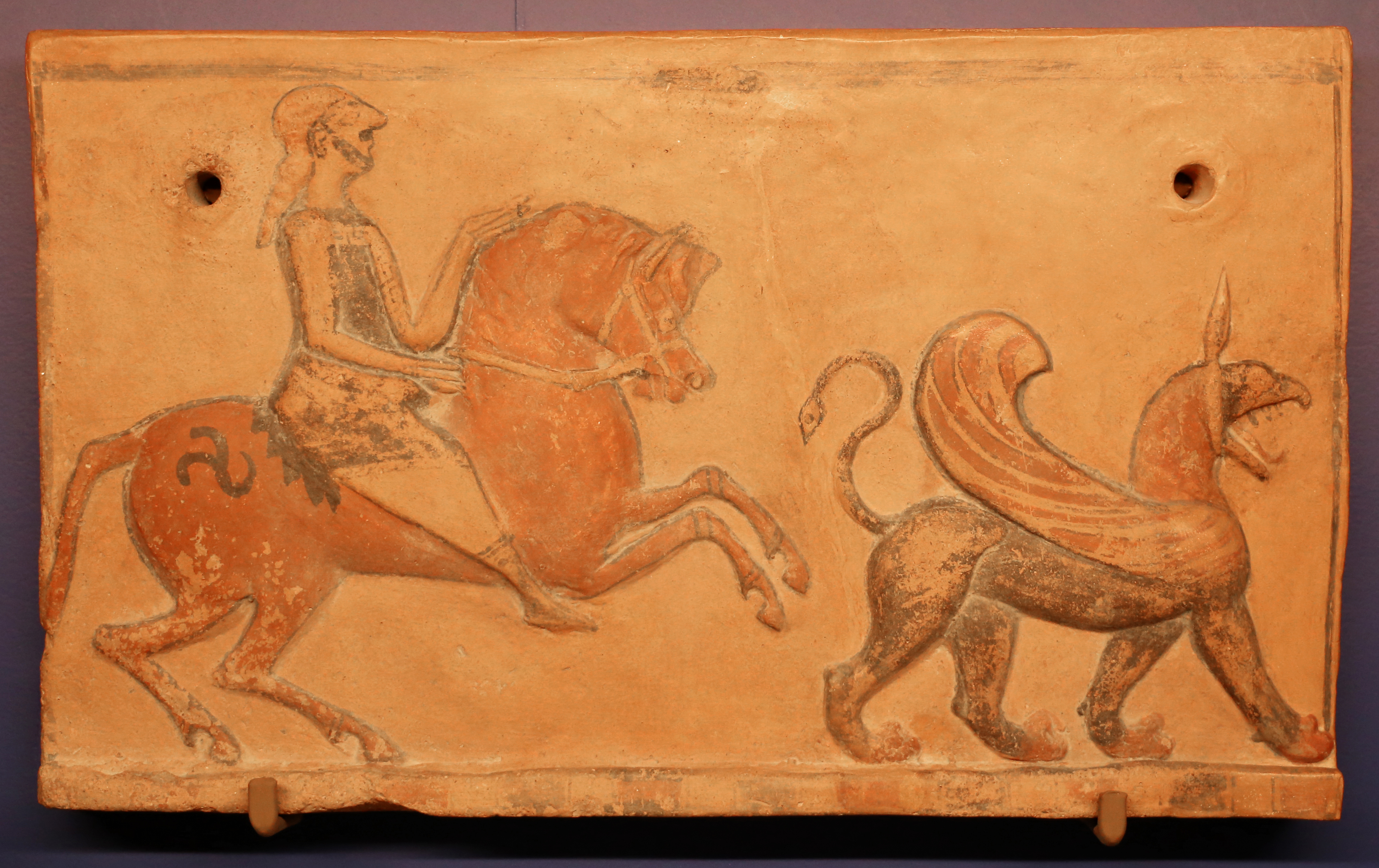
Horseman and griffin, Phrygia, 600–550 BC.

According to the Bibliotheca, the Greek hero Heracles slew a king Mygdon of the Bebryces in a battle in northwest Anatolia that if historical would have taken place about a generation before the Trojan War. According to the story, while traveling from Minoa to the Amazons, Heracles stopped in Mysia and supported the Mysians in a battle with the Bebryces. According to some interpretations, Bebryces is an alternate name for Phrygians and this Mygdon is the same person mentioned in the Iliad.

King Priam married the Phrygian princess Hecabe (or Hecuba) and maintained a close alliance with the Phrygians, who repaid him by fighting "ardently" in the Trojan War against the Greeks. Hecabe was a daughter of the Phrygian king Dymas, son of Eioneus, son of Proteus. According to the Iliad, Hecabe's younger brother Asius also fought at Troy (see above); and Quintus Smyrnaeus mentions two grandsons of Dymas that fell at the hands of Neoptolemus at the end of the Trojan War: "Two sons he slew of Meges rich in gold, Scion of Dymas – sons of high renown, cunning to hurl the dart, to drive the steed in war, and deftly cast the lance afar, born at one birth beside Sangarius' banks of Periboea to him, Celtus one, and Eubius the other." Teleutas, father of the maiden Tecmessa, is mentioned as another mythical Phrygian king.

There are indications in the Iliad that the heart of the Phrygian country was further north and downriver than it would be in later history. The Phrygian contingent arrives to aid Troy coming from Lake Ascania in northwest Anatolia, and is led by Phorcys and Ascanius, both sons of Aretaon.

In one of the so-called Homeric Hymns, Phrygia is said to be "rich in fortresses" and ruled by "famous Otreus".

== Jews of Phrygia ==
During the Roman imperial period, Jews in Phrygia, like elsewhere in Asia Minor, formed a prosperous and established minority. Centuries earlier, Seleucid king Antiochus III (r. 228–187 BC) resettled 2,000 Jewish families from Mesopotamia and Babylon in Lydia and Phrygia, aiming to strengthen Seleucid control in the region. This likely meant relocating more than 10,000 individuals to Antiochus' territories in western Asia Minor. The Jews received land, tax exemptions, and grain until they could sustain themselves from their own harvests. Antiochus specifically allocated land for vineyards, indicating a focus on viticulture, consistent with later references in the Talmud about Jewish Phrygia's wine production.

Evidence suggests the existence of synagogues in various cities, including Iconium, which had an ethnically mixed population but was sometimes considered Phrygian. At Synnada (Şuhut), a ruler of the synagogue is mentioned, indicating the presence of a synagogue. In Hierapolis (Pamukkale), a third-century sarcophagus inscription highlights the importance of the holy synagogue in burial practices. The most well-documented Phrygian synagogue was in Acmonia (Ahat), where in Nero's reign, Ioulia Severa, a descendant of Galatian royalty, funded its construction. While her patronage may not indicate personal sympathy towards Judaism, it suggests support from influential circles. Though conditions for Jews in Acmonia seemed favorable in Severa's time, their continuity is unclear. By the third century, evidence of Jewish presence in Acmonia increased, including gravestones invoking biblical curses against grave violators, indicating the integration of Jewish practices and influential positions within the community.

== Christian period ==
Visitors from Phrygia were reported to have been among the crowds present in Jerusalem on the occasion of Pentecost as recorded in Acts 2:10. In Acts 16:6 the Apostle Paul and his companion Silas travelled through Phrygia and the region of Galatia proclaiming the Christian gospel. Their plans appear to have been to go to Asia but circumstances or guidance, "in ways which we are not told, by inner promptings, or by visions of the night, or by the inspired utterances of those among their converts who had received the gift of prophecy" prevented them from doing so and instead they travelled westwards towards the coast.

The Christian heresy known as Montanism, and still known in Orthodoxy as "the Phrygian heresy", arose in the unidentified village of Ardabau in the 2nd century AD, and was distinguished by ecstatic spirituality and women priests. Originally described as a rural movement, it is now thought to have been of urban origin like other Christian developments. The new Jerusalem its adherents founded in the village of Pepouza has now been identified in a remote valley that later held a monastery.

== See also ==
- Ancient regions of Anatolia

== Bibliography ==
- Ivantchik, Askold (1993). Les Cimmériens au Proche-Orient [The Cimmerians in the Near East] (PDF) (in French). Fribourg, Switzerland; Göttingen, Germany: Éditions Universitaires Fribourg (Switzerland); Vandenhoeck & Ruprecht (Germany). ISBN 978-3-727-80876-0. Archived (PDF) from the original on 13 August 2022.
- Oreshko, Rostyslav (2021). "In Search of the Holy Cube Roots: Kubaba—Kubeleya—Κύβεβος—Kufaws and the Problem of Ethnocultural Contact in Early Iron Age Anatolia". In Bianconi, Michele (ed.). Linguistic and Cultural Interactions between Greece and Anatolia: In Search of the Golden Fleece. Leiden, Netherlands: Brill Publishers. pp. 131–166. ISBN 978-9-004-46159-8.
- Olbrycht, Marek Jan (2000). "The Cimmerian Problem Re-Examined: the Evidence of the Classical Sources". In Pstrusińska, Jadwiga [in Polish]; Fear, Andrew (eds.). Collectanea Celto-Asiatica Cracoviensia. Kraków: Księgarnia Akademicka. pp. 71–100. ISBN 978-8-371-88337-8. Archived from the original on 13 August 2022.
- Scott, James M. (1995). Paul and the Nations: The Old Testament and Jewish Background of Paul's Mission to the Nations with Special Reference to the Destination of Galatians. Mohr Siebeck. ISBN 978-3161463778.
- Sulimirski, Tadeusz; Taylor, T. F. (1991). "The Scythians". In Boardman, John; Edwards, I. E. S.; Hammond, N. G. L.; Sollberger, E.; Walker, C. B. F. (eds.). The Assyrian and Babylonian Empires and other States of the Near East, from the Eighth to the Sixth Centuries B.C. The Cambridge Ancient History. Vol. 3. Cambridge, United Kingdom: Cambridge University Press. pp. 547–590. ISBN 978-1-139-05429-4.
- Thonemann, Peter, ed. (2013). Roman Phrygia: culture and society. Cambridge: Cambridge University Press. ISBN 978-1-107-03128-9.
