= Cimmerian invasion of Phrygia =

7th century B.C. military operation

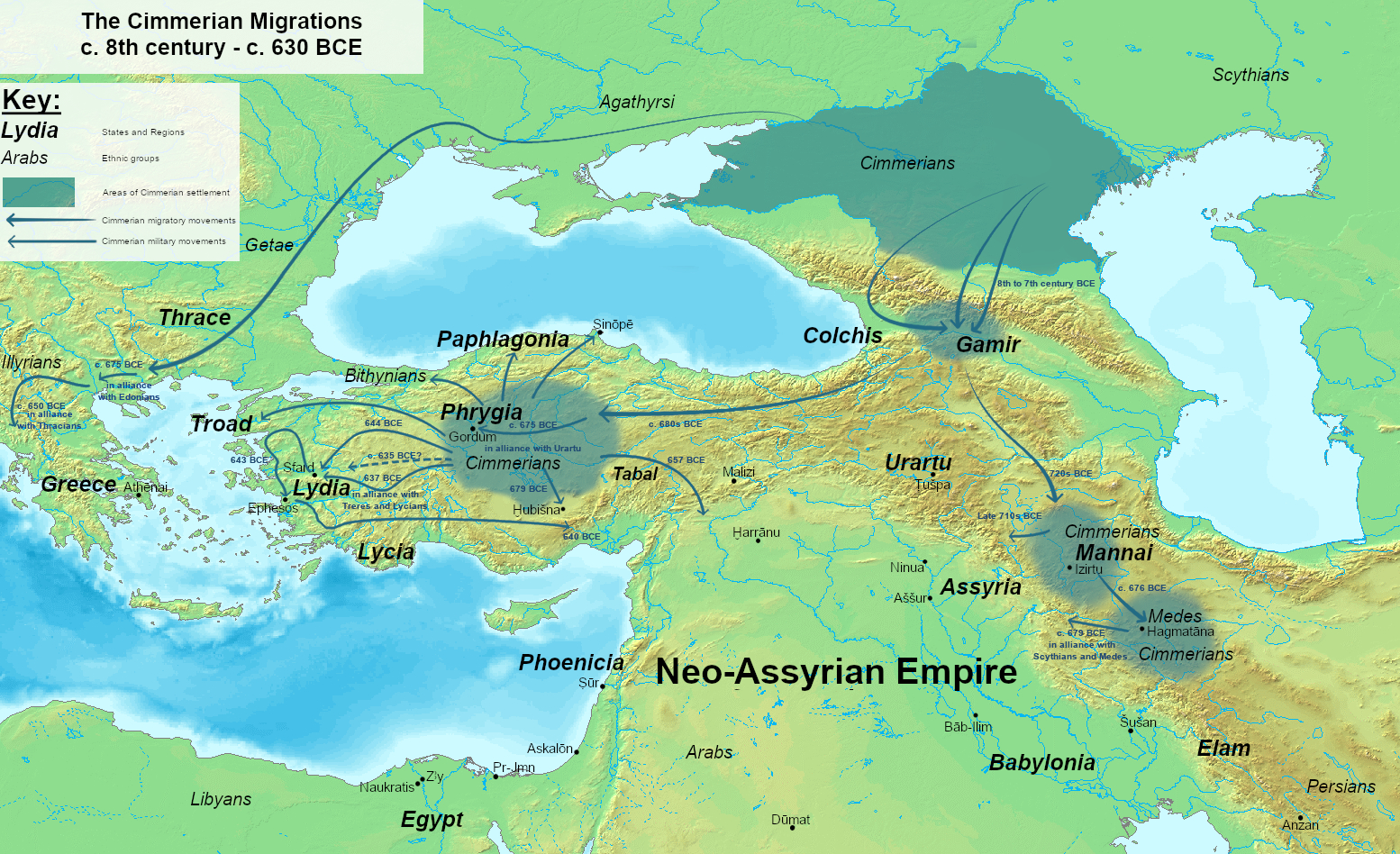
- Map of Cimmerian migrations, including their invasion of Phrygia. Note that the map labels the date of the invasion as c. 675 B.C., while most sources label it as c. 696.
| Date | 7th century, B.C. |
| Location | Phrygia (present-day Turkey) |
| Result | Dissolution of the Phrygian kingdom, hegemony is transferred to the Lydians |

Belligerents
| Cimmerians; Urartu | Phrygia; Assyria |

Commanders and leaders
| Teušpā; Rusa II | Midas; Esarhaddon |

The Cimmerian invasion of Phrygia occurred in the 7th century B.C. Around 696, the Cimmerian people invaded Phrygia with help of the King of Urartu, Rusa II. They burned the kingdom's city of Gordium, which likely caused the Phrygian king Midas to commit suicide. Around 680, the Phrygian kingdom dissolved, and their hegemony was later transferred to the Lydians.

== Background ==
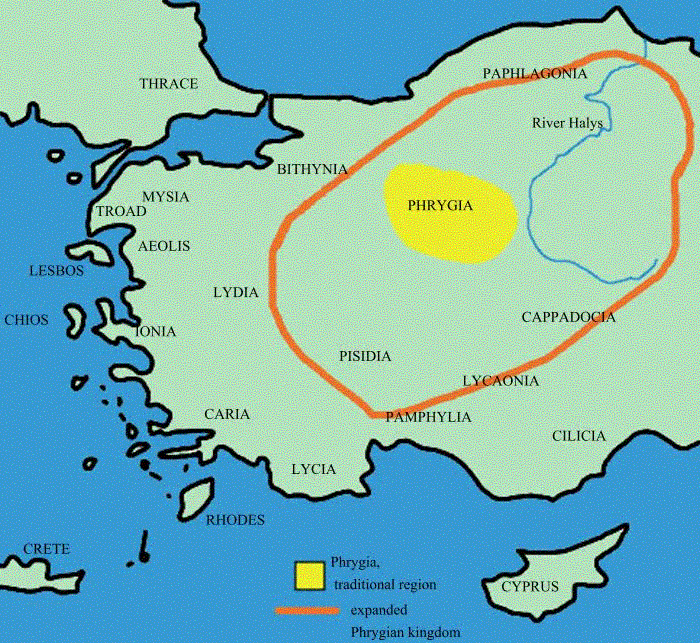
The Phrygian kingdom at its height in 700 B.C.

Around 730 B.C., after the Assyrians took the eastern part of the Phrygian confederacy, king Midas took control of Phrygia proper. In 715, the Cimmerians defeated the Urartian king Rusa I and seized the eastern province of Asia Minor. Midas feared a Cimmerian invasion of Phrygia and asked for help from Assyria. In 705, the Cimmerians tried to cross the Assyrian frontier and were defeated by Sargon II's forces. According to Assyrian religious texts, the Urartian king Rusa II later recruited a large number of Cimmerians as mercenaries. Some Cimmerians were probably present when Rusa II tried to enter south-west Asia in ~672. In Asia Minor, the Cimmerians had success when they seized Cappadocia, went into Paphlagonia and captured the Greek city of Sinope on the Black Sea.

== Course of the war ==
Most sources say the invasion was around 696 to 695 B.C., though some date it to 679 or 676. The Cimmerians were allied with Rusa II. The speed and strength of the invasion took the Phrygians by surprise, and they were forced to retreat to the city of Gordium. The people in the countryside moved inside the city as well, hoping to be protected by its walls. The Cimmerians overran the walls and set the city on fire; according to Greek historian Herodotus, this caused Midas to commit suicide. He died in the city's citadel; Roman geographer Strabo wrote 600 years later that he died of drinking pig's blood. Assyrian king Esarhaddon marched his army up to the city to meet the Cimmerians. The two armies battled in Cilicia. Esarhaddon claimed he killed the Cimmerian king Teušpā with his own hands. This halted the invasion, and stopped more warfare from happening in western Asia Minor, but the Phrygian kingdom nonetheless dissolved. This dissolution happened in 680 or 675.

== Aftermath ==
The Cimmerians were defeated in battle by King Gyges of Lydia in c. 663, but in 643, they captured the Lydian capital city of Sardis. In 637 or 626, the forces of Lydian king Alyettes routed the Cimmerians and killed their king, Dugdamme. The Cimmerians then retreated to Cilicia. Hegemony of the area was later transferred to the Lydians.

The villages destroyed in the invasion never recovered, and the trade routes dominated by Phrygian merchants were now used by villages to the west. After the empire dissolved, the "Phrygians" were a geographic expression for those who lived under later Anatolian rulers. Those peoples were taken as slaves by the Greeks. Phrygia was never again a political entity.

== Sources ==
- Kohn, George Childs (2013). Dictionary of War, Taylor & Francis. ISBN 9781135954949
- John Boardman, I. E. S. Edwards, E. Sollberger, N. G. L. Hammond (1991). Cambridge Ancient History: The Assyrian and Babylonian Empires and Other States of the Near East, from the Eighth to the Sixth Centuries BC, Cambridge University Press. ISBN 9780521227179
- Bauer, Susan Wise (2007). The History of the Ancient World: From the Earliest Accounts to the Fall of Rome, W.W. Norton. ISBN 9780393070897
- Muhammad A. Dandamaev, Vladimir G. Lukonin (2004). The Culture and Social Institutions of Ancient Iran, Columbia University Press. ISBN 9780521611916
