= Amyntas, Tetrarch of the Tectosagii =

Amyntas (Greek: Ἀμύντας) was Tetrarch of the Tectosages and King of Cilicia Trachea between 36 BC and 25 BC. He was the predecessor of Polemon I of Pontus as King of Cilicia Trachea. Amyntas was a son of Dytilaos, Tetrarch of the Tectosagii.

Amyntas was the father of a Princess of the Tectosagii who married Artemidoros of the Trocmii, son of Amyntas, Tetrarch of the Trocmii, King of Galatia. Through his daughter and her husband he was grandfather of Gaius Julius Severus, a nobleman from Akmonia at Galatia, in turn the father of Gaius Julius Bassus, Proconsul in Bithynia in 98, and Gaius Julius Severus, a Tribune in Legio VI Ferrata.
