= Mygdon =

Several figures in Greek mythology

In Greek mythology, Mygdon (Ancient Greek: Μύγδων) may refer to the following personages:

- Mygdon, son of Ares and Callirhoe, eponymous of Mygdones
- Mygdon (brother of Amycus), killed by Heracles, son of Poseidon.
- Mygdon of Phrygia, king who was an ally of King Priam of Troy.

== See also ==
- Mygdonia (disambiguation)
