= Acmon (father of Mygdon) =

In Greek mythology, a Phrygian king

In Greek mythology, Acmon (Ancient Greek: Ἄκμων, lit. 'anvil, pestle') was a Phrygian king who gave his name to the district known as Acmonia; he was the father of Mygdon, his successor.
