= Otreus =

In the Greek mythological tradition, Otreus (Ancient Greek: Ὀτρεύς) was the legendary founder of Otrea in southern Bithynia (Hellespont Phrygia). His name has also been linked to Otrous, a Phyrgian town on the Eucarpitic plain. He is possibly depicted on coins found in the area of Ilium.

The father of Otreus is supposed by the scholiast on Homer to have been a son of Dymas, presumably the Dymas who was king of Phyrgia.

== In the Homeric and epic tradition ==
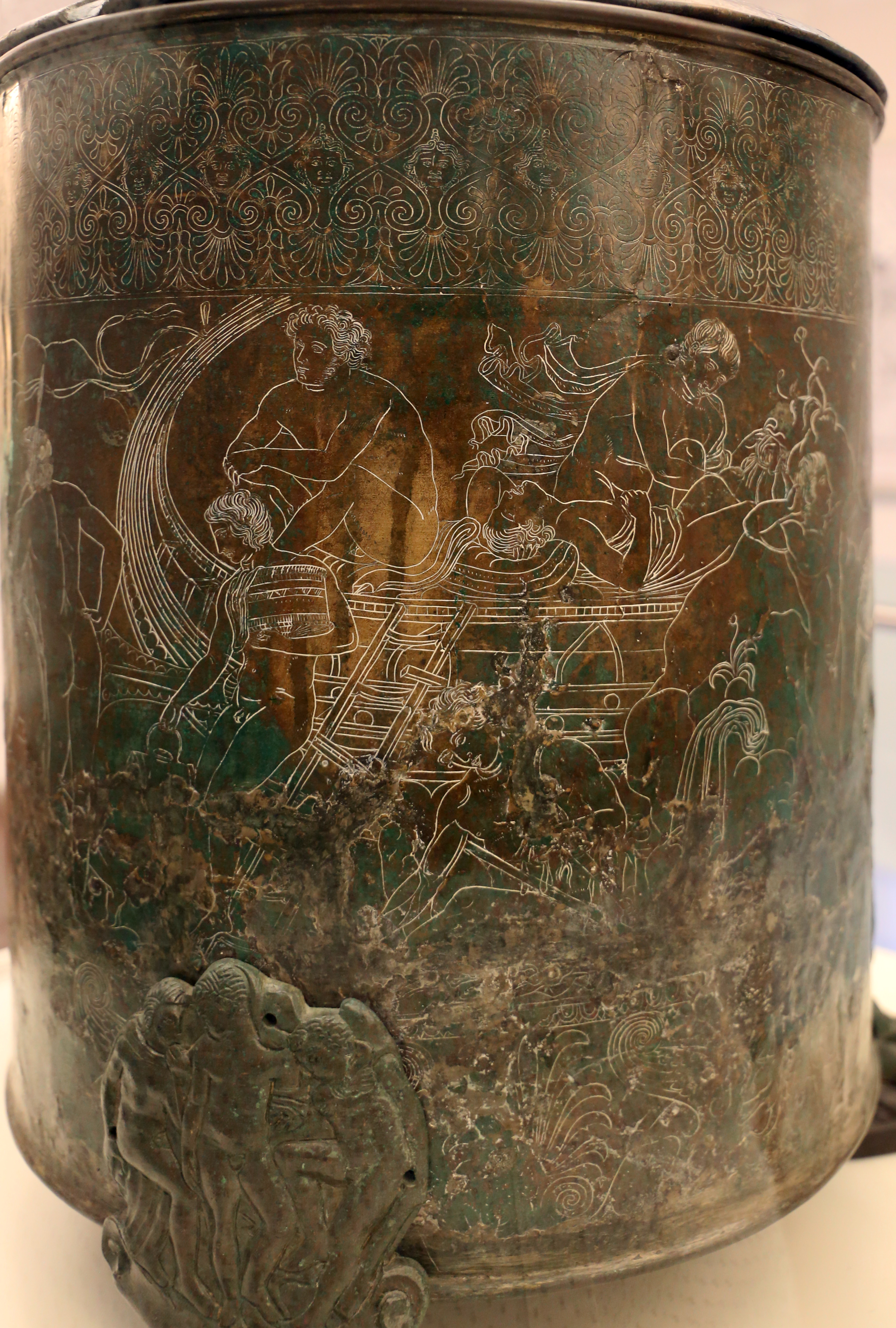
Detail from an Etruscan cista (340–330 BC) depicting the arrival of the Argonauts in the land of Amycus

Otreus is mentioned in the Iliad only once by name, as having fought in a battle on the banks of the Sangarius against the Amazons, alongside Mygdon of Phrygia. The aging king of Troy, Priam, is telling Helen about the battle, in which he had fought as a young man. Otreus is therefore to be placed among the heroic generation before the Trojan War.

In the Argonautica of Valerius Flaccus, Otreus is also said to be a companion of Mygdon, but the Dymas in the Argonautica who is connected to Otreus identifies himself as his friend and squire. Valerius Flaccus has Dymas say that Otreus was killed by Amycus, a mythological type of the cruel tyrant who imposes a usually fatal task on travelers before he will allow them to pass through his territory, thus warning the Argonauts to anticipate this hazard, which they duly overcome. Their last major stopping-off point before they reach their destination takes them to the land of the Mariandyni where Lycus reigns. This Lycus is said to be the brother of Otreus, who ought to avenge his death.

The family connections of Otreus in the Argonautica don't necessarily line up with the reference in the Iliad in terms of timeline. His death at the hands of Amycus is said to have occurred on his way to ask for the hand of Hesione in marriage, but according to post-Homeric legend, she had left Troy when Priam was a boy.

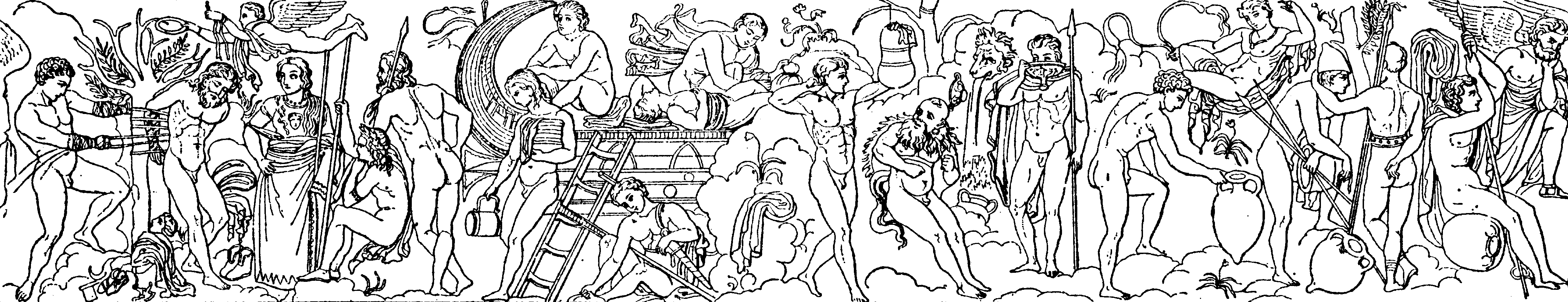
Drawing of the full scene around the cista depicting events leading up to the punishment of Amycus (left)

=== Homeric Hymn to Aphrodite and Phrygian identity ===
In the Homeric Hymn to Aphrodite, when in disguise to seduce the Trojan noble Anchises, Aphrodite pretends to be the mortal daughter of Otreus, identifying him as "the king of all of well-walled Phrygia." Deception was required to overcome any reluctance a mortal man might feel about the cost of sleeping with a goddess. The disguised Aphrodite further explains that although she is Phrygrian, she can speak to Anchises in his own language because she was brought up by a Trojan nursemaid—a linguistic point indicating that in this period, the Phrygian and Trojan languages were distinct enough not to be mutually intelligible without acquisition.

Ezra Pound names Otreus in Canto XXIII in a thematic use of the Homeric and Epic Cycle to show recurring patterns in history. In a narrative passage that alludes to the Homeric hymn, Anchises is chatting with a helmsman as they sail. The helmsman observes that Adonis, another mortal desired by Aphrodite, died a virgin, and Anchises recalls Aphrodite's ruse and how she claimed "King Otreus, of Phrygia,/ that king is my father." Pound's layered patterning may reference the fall of Troy and surrounding events in relation to the destruction of Smyrna during the Greco-Turkish War.

== Phrygian coins ==
B. V. Head identified Otreus as the figure depicted on a Phrygian coin that shows a warrior stepping onto the prow of a ship. The figure wears only a chlamys (a type of cloak) and is armed with a spear. Ernest Babelon believed this figure to be Aeneas, but the nudity may signify a semidivine founding hero, whereas Aeneas is more securely identified as fully armored on other coins of Otrous and neighboring Stectorium, the city of Otreus's friend Mygdon. Pausanias's note that the tomb of Mygdon was located in Stectorium suggests he was venerated as a founding hero there. Some coins issued at Stectorium otherwise identified as Hector may therefore represent Mygdon, and Head proposed that the friends Mygdon and Otreus were similarly honored in their respective cities. The coins in question were issued at Otrous during the reign of Geta.
