= Otroea semiflava =

Scientific classification
- Kingdom: Animalia
- Phylum: Arthropoda
- Class: Insecta
- Order: Coleoptera
- Suborder: Polyphaga
- Infraorder: Cucujiformia
- Family: Cerambycidae
- Genus: Otroea
- Species: O. semiflava

Binomial name
- Otroea semiflava Pascoe, 1866

Species of beetle

Otroea semiflava is a species of beetle in the family Cerambycidae. It was described by Pascoe in 1866. It is known from Moluccas.

== Subspecies ==
- Otroea semiflava giloloensis Breuning, 1948
- Otroea semiflava semiflava Pascoe, 1866
