= Dytilaos, Tetrarch of the Tectosagii =

Dytilaos, was a Tetrarch of the Tectosagii in the 1st century BC. He was the father of Amyntas, Tetrarch of the Tectosagii and King of Cilicia Trachae.
