= Stectorium =

Titular see of the Catholic church

Coordinates: 38°19′57″N 30°08′38″E

Stectorium or Stektorion (Ancient Greek: Στεκτόριον) was a town of ancient Phrygia, in the Phrygian Pentapolis between Peltae and Synnada, inhabited during Roman and Byzantine times. Pausanias believed that Mygdon's tomb was located here.

It was an episcopal see of a bishop; no longer a territorial diocese, it remains a Latin Church titular see of the Catholic Church.

Its site is located near Kocahüyük in Asiatic Turkey.
