= Nannacus =

In Greek mythology, Nannacus (also Annacus; ancient Greek: Νάννακος, Άννακός) was a legendary king of Phrygia before the Flood of Deucalion. His city was Iconium in modern Turkey.

== Flood prediction ==
Nannacus himself had predicted the Flood and had organized public prayers to avert this disaster. These prayers were accompanied by lamentations and from this came the proverbial phrase "weep like Nannacus" (ancient Greek: τα Ναννάκου κλαϋσομαι). The earliest attestation of this proverb is from the third century BC.

According to Stephanus of Byzantium, Nannacus lived three hundred years. There was an oracle that said that when Nannacus died, all his people would perish. Indeed, shortly after the death of Nannacus (whom his subjects greatly mourned), the Deluge of Deucalion came and thus the oracle was fulfilled.

At the end of the flood, Prometheus, on the orders of Zeus, again created "images" (Greek: εἰκόνες/eikones) of people and revived them, from where the name of the place Iconium (Ἰκόνιον) arose.

== Mythological parallels ==
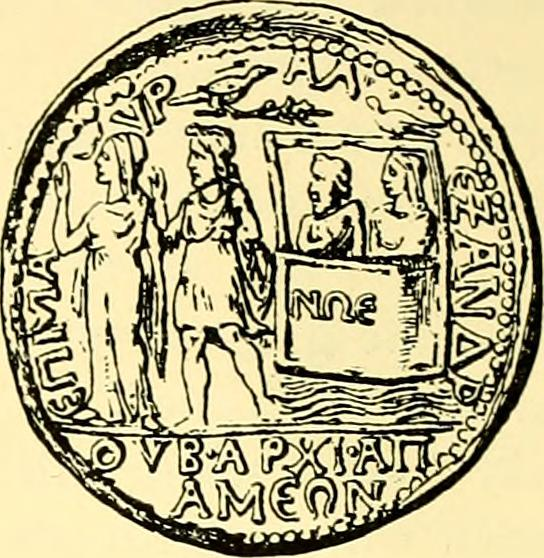
A coin of Apamea Kibotos featuring the Ark of Noah

Also in Asia Minor, the city of Apamea (Phrygia) (Apamea Cibotus) had boasted of its connection to the Flood. According to James Frazer,

[Its name] "... Cibotos, which the city assumed, is the Greek word for chest or ark; and on coins of the city, minted in the reigns of Severus, Macrinus, and Philip the Elder (ruled in 244-249 AD), we see the ark floating on water with two passengers in it, whose figures appear from the waist upwards; beside the ark two other human figures, one male and the other female, are represented standing; and lastly, on the top of the chest are perched two birds, one of them said to be a raven and the other a dove carrying an olive-branch. ... the name 'Noe', the Greek equivalent of Noah, is inscribed on the ark. No doubt, the two human figures represent Noah and his wife twice over, first in the ark, and afterwards outside of it."

Some scholars have suggested that the patriarch Nannacus was identical to the biblical patriarch Enoch who lived before the flood for three hundred and sixty-five years and was then removed from the world in a mysterious fashion.

== See also ==
- Ancient Greek flood myths
- Genesis flood narrative
- Phrygians

== Bibliography ==
- Frazer, James George (1916). "Ancient Stories of a Great Flood". The Journal of the Royal Anthropological Institute of Great Britain and Ireland. 46. JSTOR: 231–283. doi:10.2307/2843393. ISSN 0307-3114. JSTOR 2843393.
- Dillmann August, Die Genesis Erklärt. Leipzig, 1892. p.115
- Jacob Bryant, A new system: or, An analysis of ancient mythology. 1807. vol. III, рages 12-14
