= Drymos, Thessaloniki =

Drymos Δρυμός
- Community
- Location within Greece
- Coordinates: 40°46.8′N 22°57.5′E
- Country: Greece
- Administrative region: Central Macedonia
- Regional unit: Thessaloniki
- Municipality: Oraiokastro
- Municipal unit: Mygdonia

Area
  - Community: 42.011 km^{2} (16.221 sq mi)
- Elevation: 200 m (660 ft)

Population (2021)
  - Community: 2,866
  - Density: 68.22/km^{2} (176.7/sq mi)
- Time zone: UTC+2 (EET)
  - Summer (DST): UTC+3 (EEST)
- Postal code: 545 00
- Area code: +30-2394
- Vehicle registration: NA to NX

Drymos (Greek: Δρυμός), known before 1926 as Dremiglava (Greek: Δρυμίγκλαβα), is a village and a community of the Oraiokastro municipality. Before the 2011 local government reform it was part of the municipality of Mygdonia, of which it was a municipal district. The 2021 census recorded 2,866 inhabitants in the village. The community of Drymos covers an area of 42.011 km^{2}.

== Transportation ==
The nearest main road is the Liti–Nea Santa National Road, a branch of the EO65 road that bypasses the village to the south west.

== See also ==
- List of settlements in the Thessaloniki regional unit
- Mygdonia A.C.
