= Otroea cinerascens =

Scientific classification
- Kingdom: Animalia
- Phylum: Arthropoda
- Class: Insecta
- Order: Coleoptera
- Suborder: Polyphaga
- Infraorder: Cucujiformia
- Family: Cerambycidae
- Genus: Otroea
- Species: O. cinerascens

Binomial name
- Otroea cinerascens Pascoe, 1866

Species of beetle

Otroea cinerascens is a species of beetle in the family Cerambycidae. It was described by Pascoe in 1866.

== Subspecies ==
- Otroea cinerascens cinerascens Pascoe, 1866
- Otroea cinerascens vitticollis Breuning, 1948
