= Mygdonia (disambiguation) =

Mygdonia was a district of ancient Macedon.

Mygdonia (Greek: Μυγδονία) can also refer to:

- Mygdonia (Thrace), a town of ancient Thrace
- Antiochia Mygdonia, a Seleucid colony in ancient Mesopotamia
- Mygdonia, Thessaloniki, a municipal unit near Thessaloniki, Greece
- Mygdonia A.C., a badminton club, Drimos, Thessaloniki, Greece
- Mygdonia (bug), a genus of bugs in the tribe Mictini

== See also ==
- Mygdonius, ancient Greek name for the Jaghjagh River
