= Phrygians =

Ancient Indo-European-speaking people of Anatolia

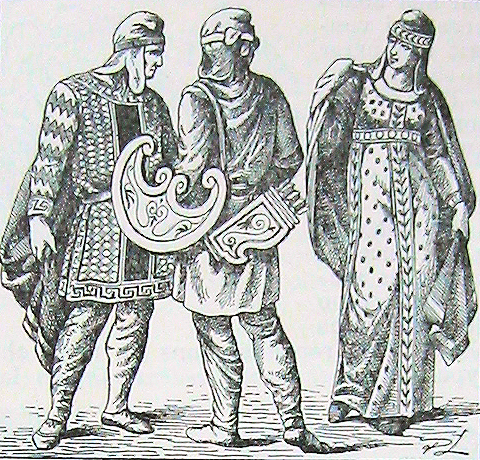
Phrygians

The Phrygians (Greek: Φρύγες, Phruges or Phryges) were an ancient Indo-European speaking people who inhabited central-western Anatolia (modern-day Turkey) in antiquity.

Ancient Greek authors used "Phrygian" as an umbrella term to describe a vast ethno-cultural complex located mainly in the central areas of Anatolia rather than a name of a single "tribe" or "people", and its ethno-linguistic homogeneity is debatable. Phrygians were initially dwelling in the southern Balkans – according to Herodotus – under the name of Bryges (Briges), changing it to Phryges after their final migration to Anatolia, via the Hellespont. Many historians support a Phrygian migration from Europe to Asia Minor c. 1200 BC, although Anatolian archaeologists have generally abandoned the idea. It has been suggested that the Phrygian migration to Asia Minor, mentioned in Greek sources to have occurred shortly after the Trojan War, happened much earlier, and in many stages.

Phrygia developed an advanced Bronze Age culture. The earliest traditions of Greek music are in part connected to Phrygian music, transmitted through the Greek colonies in Anatolia, especially the Phrygian mode, which was considered to be the warlike mode in ancient Greek music. According to a myth, the Phrygian King Midas (of the "golden touch") was tutored in music by Orpheus. Another musical invention that came from Phrygia was the aulos, a reed instrument with two pipes. In classical Greek iconography, Paris, a Trojan, is represented as non-Greek by his Phrygian cap, which was also worn by Mithras and survived into modern imagery as the "liberty cap" of the American and French revolutionaries.

Phrygians spoke the Phrygian language, a member of the Indo-European linguistic family. Modern consensus regards Greek as its closest relative.

== History ==
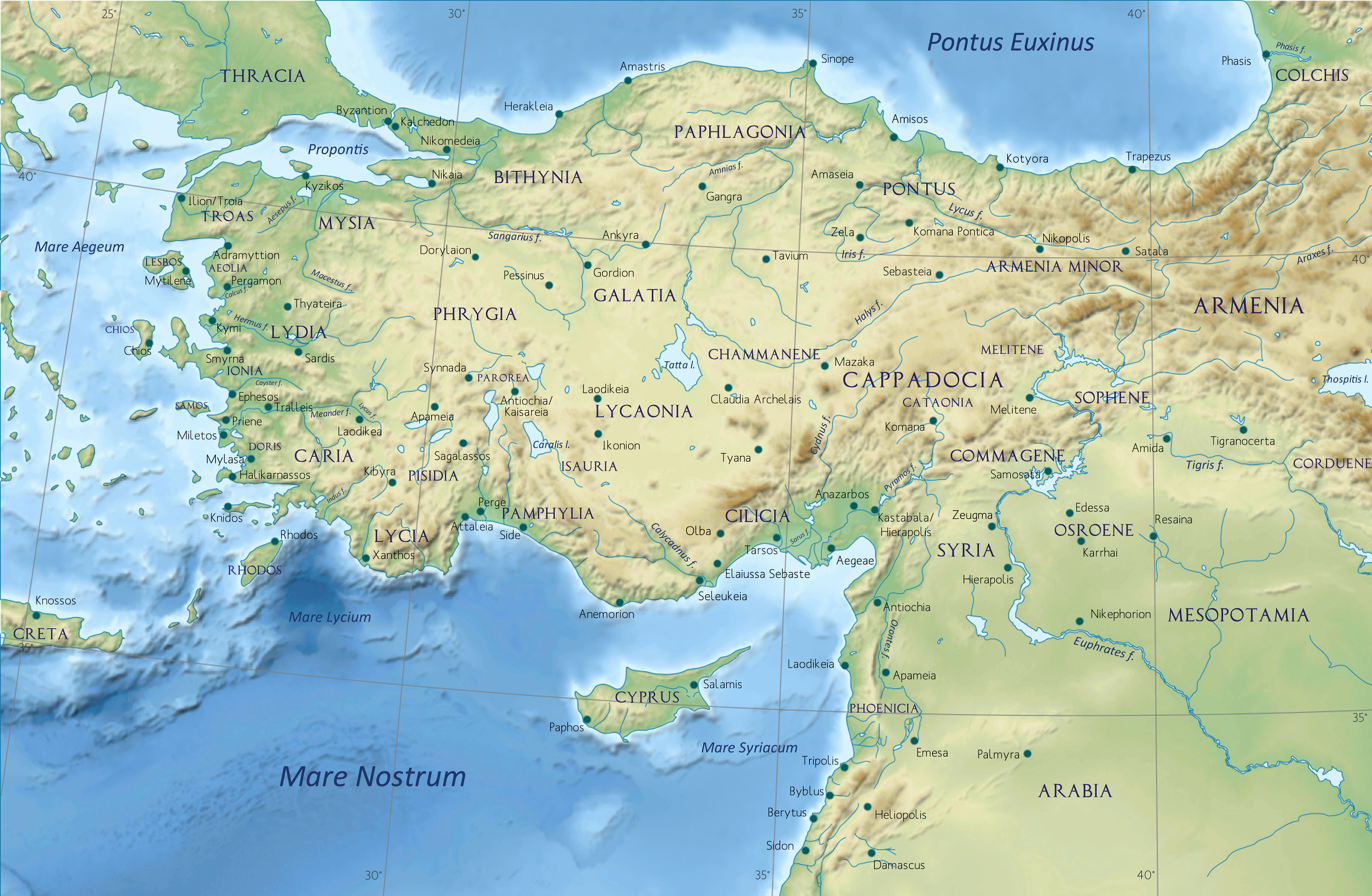
Classical regions of Asia Minor/Anatolia

A conventional date of c. 1180 BC is often used for the influx (traditionally from Thrace) of the pre-Phrygian Bryges or Mushki, corresponding to the very end of the Hittite Empire. Following this date, Phrygia retained a separate cultural identity. From tribal and village beginnings, the state of Phrygia arose in the 8th century BC with its capital at Gordium. Around 690 BC, it was invaded by the Cimmerians. Phrygia was briefly conquered by its neighbour Lydia, before it passed successively into the Persian Empire of Cyrus the Great and later the empire of Alexander and his successors. Later, it was taken by the Attalids of Pergamon, and eventually became part of the Roman Empire. The last mention of the Phrygian language in literature dates to the 5th century AD, and it was likely extinct by the 7th century.

=== Migration ===
After the collapse of the Hittite Empire at the beginning of the twelfth century BC, the political vacuum in central-western Anatolia was filled by a wave of Indo-European migrants and "Sea Peoples", including the Phrygians, who established their kingdom with a capital eventually at Gordium. It is presently unknown whether the Phrygians were actively involved in the collapse of the Hittite capital Hattusa or whether they simply moved into the vacuum left by the collapse of Hittite hegemony. The so-called Handmade Knobbed Ware was found by archaeologists at sites from this period in Western Anatolia. According to Greek mythographers, Midas had been king of the Phrygians, who were originally called the Bryges (Brigi) and came from the western part of archaic Thrace or Macedon. Midas has been linked to the Mushki king Mita. However, the origins of the Mushki and their connection to the Phrygians are uncertain. Some scholars have suggested that Mita was a Luwian name (it was recorded in Asia Minor in the 15th century BC).

Though the migration theory is still defended by many modern historians, most archaeologists have abandoned it as the origin of the Phrygians due to a lack substantial archeological evidence, with the theory resting only on the accounts of Herodotus and Xanthus.

=== 8th to 7th centuries ===
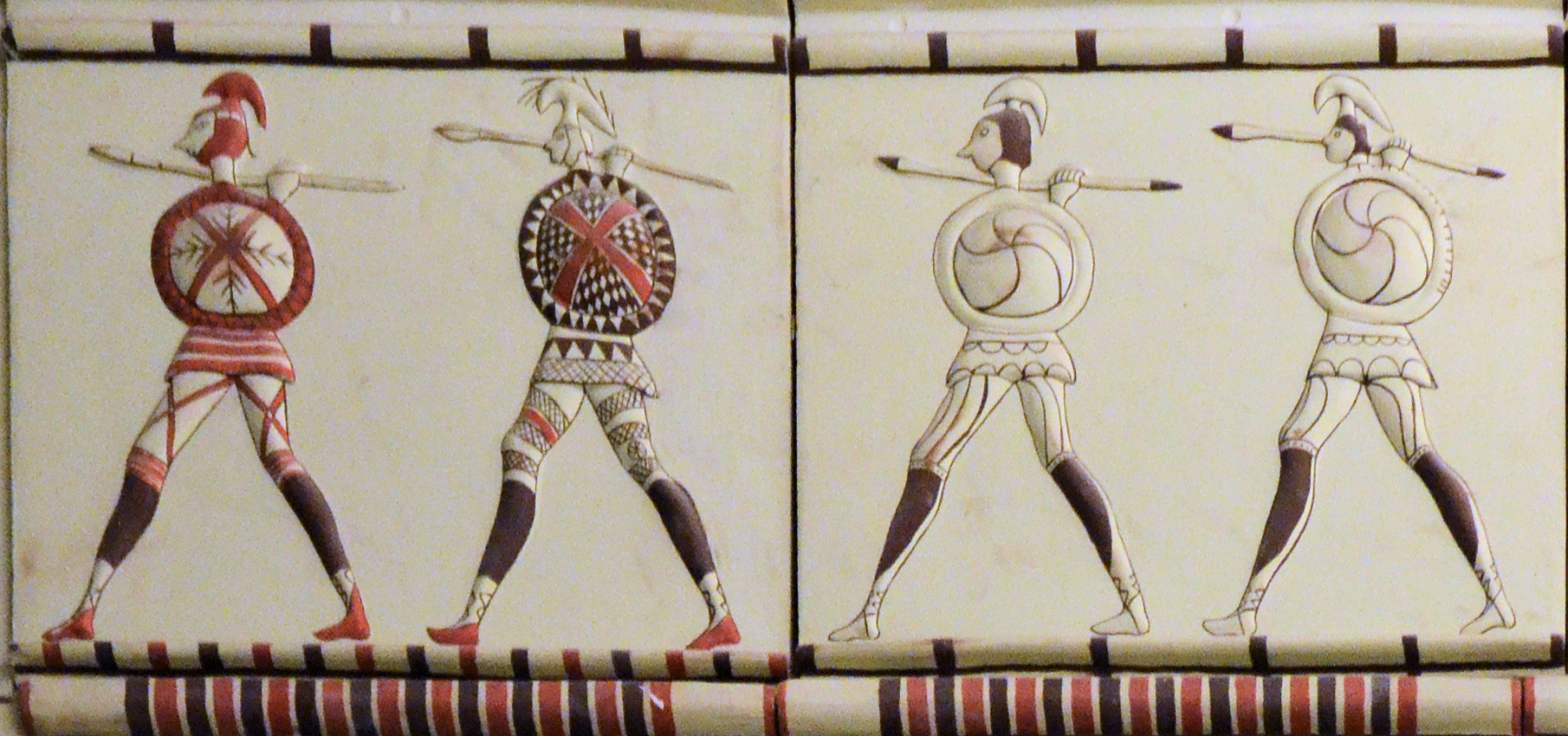
Phrygian soldiers. Detail from a reconstruction of a Phrygian building at Pazarlı, Çorum, Turkey, 7th–6th centuries BC.

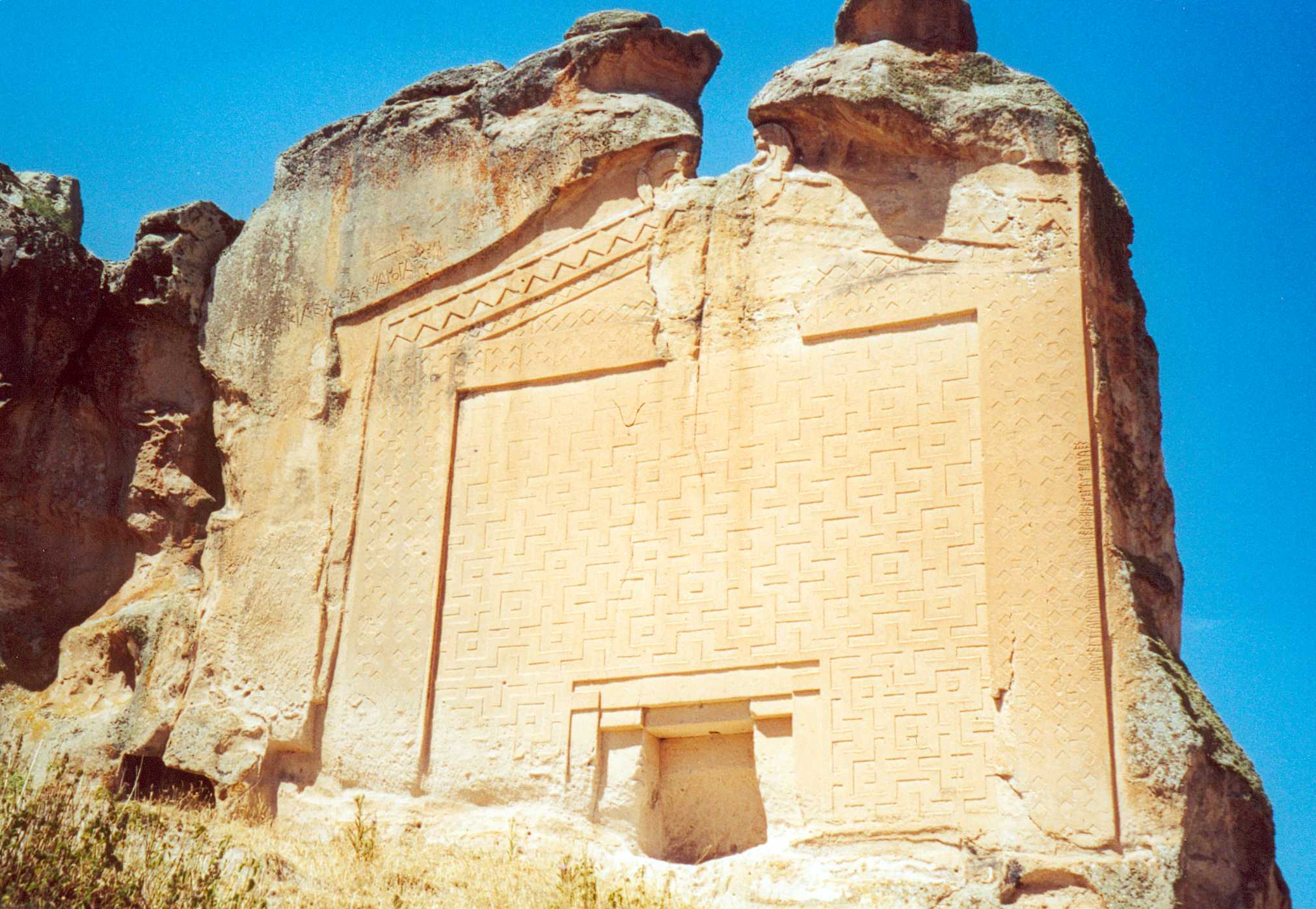
Tomb at ‘Midas City’, near Eskişehir (sixth century BC)

Assyrian sources from the 8th century BC speak of a king Mita of the Mushki, identified with king Midas of Phrygia. An Assyrian inscription records Mita as an ally of Sargon of Assyria in 709 BC. A distinctive Phrygian pottery called Polished Ware appears in the 8th century BC. The Phrygians founded a powerful kingdom, which lasted until the Lydian ascendancy (7th century BC). Under kings alternately named Gordias and Midas, the independent Phrygian kingdom of the 8th and 7th centuries BC maintained close trade contacts with its neighbours in the east and the Greeks in the west. Phrygia seems to have been able to co-exist with whatever power was dominant in eastern Anatolia at the time.

The invasion of Anatolia in the late 8th century BC to early 7th century BC by the Cimmerians was to prove fatal to independent Phrygia. Cimmerian pressure and attacks culminated in the suicide of its last king, Midas, according to legend. Gordium fell to the Cimmerians in 696 BC and was sacked and burnt, as reported much later by Herodotus.

A series of digs has opened Gordium as one of Turkey's most revealing archeological sites. Excavations confirm a violent destruction of Gordion around 675 BC. A tomb of the Midas period, popularly identified as the "Tomb of Midas", revealed a wooden structure deeply buried under a vast tumulus, containing grave goods, a coffin, furniture, and food offerings (Archaeological Museum, Ankara). The Gordium site contains a considerably later building program, perhaps by Alyattes, the Lydian king, in the 6th century BC.

Minor Phrygian kingdoms continued to exist after the end of the Phrygian empire, and the Phrygian art and culture continued to flourish. Cimmerian people stayed in Anatolia, but did not appear to have created a kingdom of their own. The Lydians repulsed the Cimmerians in the 620s, and Phrygia was subsumed into a short-lived Lydian empire. The eastern part of the former Phrygian empire fell into the hands of the Medes in 585 BC.

=== Croesus' Lydian Empire ===
Under the proverbially rich King Croesus (reigned 560–546 BC), Phrygia remained part of the Lydian empire that extended east to the Halys River. There may be an echo of strife with Lydia and perhaps a veiled reference to a royal hostage in the legend of the twice-unlucky Adrastus, the son of King Gordias with the queen, Eurynome. He accidentally killed his brother and exiled himself to Lydia, where King Croesus welcomed him. Once again, Adrastus accidentally killed Croesus' son and then committed suicide.

=== Post-state history ===
Lydian Croesus was conquered by Cyrus in 546 BC, and Phrygia passed under Persian dominion. After Darius became Persian Emperor in 521 BC, he remade the ancient trade route into the Persian "Royal Road" and instituted administrative reforms that included setting up satrapies (provinces). In the 5th century, Phrygia was made into two administrative provinces: that of Hellespontine Phrygia (or Lesser Phrygia), with its provincial capital established at Dascylium, and the province of Greater Phrygia.

== Culture ==
=== Language ===
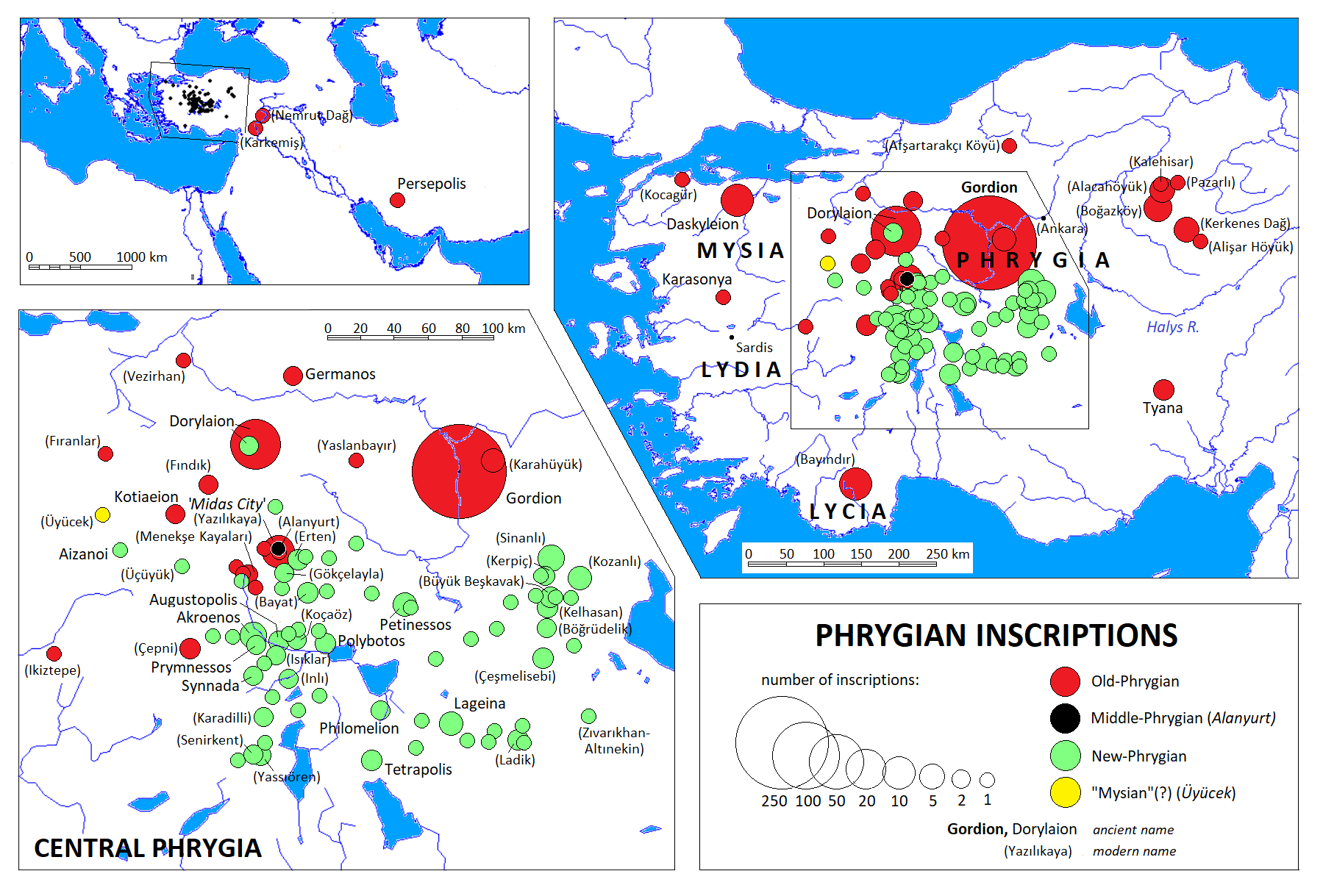
Map showing where Phrygian inscriptions have been found.

The Phrygian language is a member of the Indo-European linguistic family, with its exact position within it having been debated due to the fragmentary nature of its evidence. Though from what is available, it is evident that Phrygian shares important features with Greek and Armenian. Between the 19th and the first half of the 20th century, Phrygian was mostly considered part of the satem group of the Indo-European languages, and thus close to Armenian and Thracian, while today it is commonly considered to be a centum language and thus closer to Greek. The reason that, in the past, Phrygian had the guise of a satem language was due to two secondary processes that affected it. Namely, Phrygian merged the old labiovelar with the plain velar, and secondly, when in contact with palatal vowels /e/ and /i/, especially in initial position, some consonants became palatalized. Furthermore, Kortlandt (1988) presented common sound changes of Thracian and Armenian and their separation from Phrygian and the rest of the palaeo-Balkan languages from an early stage.

Modern consensus regards Greek as the closest relative of Phrygian, a position that is supported by Brixhe, Neumann, Matzinger, Woodhouse, Ligorio, Lubotsky, and Obrador-Cursach. Furthermore, 34 out of the 36 Phrygian isoglosses that are recorded are shared with Greek, with 22 being exclusive between them. The last 50 years of Phrygian scholarship developed a hypothesis that proposes a proto-Graeco-Phrygian stage out of which Greek and Phrygian originated, and if Phrygian were more sufficiently attested, that stage could perhaps be reconstructed.

=== Archaeology ===
Based on an extremely slight archaeological record, some scholars such as Nicholas Hammond and Eugene N. Borza had suggested that the Brygians and Phrygians were members of the Lusatian culture who migrated into the southern Balkans during the Late Bronze Age. According to Konstantinos Kopanias, there is no archaeological evidence that can be associated with the Brygians to help us pinpoint them on the map. Many historians support a Phrygian migration from Europe to Asia Minor c. 1200 BC; though, Anatolian archaeologists have generally abandoned the idea due to lack of western (European) ceramic ware, and the continuation of the pre-Bronze Age collapse pottery styles in central Asia Minor. It has been suggested that the Phrygian migration to Asia Minor, mentioned in Greek sources to have occurred shortly after the Trojan War, happened much earlier, and in many stages.

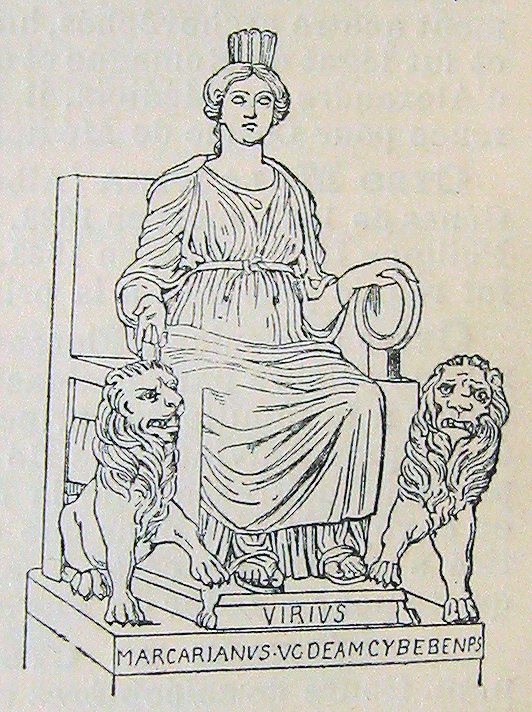
The Phrygian goddess Cybele with her attributes

=== Religion ===
The Phrygians worshipped the goddess Cybele. In their language, it was known as Matar 'Mother', and was also referred to as Matar Kubileya 'Mother of the mountain' (from which the Greek Kybele and Latin Cybele derive) or Matar areyastin. In her typical Phrygian form, she wears a long belted dress, a polos (a high cylindrical headdress), and a veil covering the whole body. The later version of Cybele was established by a pupil of Phidias, the sculptor Agoracritus, and became the image most widely adopted by Cybele's expanding following, both in the Aegean world and at Rome. It shows her humanized though still enthroned, her hand resting on an attendant lion and the other holding the tympanon, a circular frame drum, similar to a tambourine.

The Phrygians also venerated Sabazios, the sky and father-god depicted on horseback. Although the Greeks associated Sabazios with Zeus, representations of him, even at Roman times, show him as a horseman god. His conflicts with the indigenous Mother Goddess, whose creature was the Lunar Bull, may be surmised in the way that Sabazios' horse places a hoof on the head of a bull, in a Roman relief at the Museum of Fine Arts, Boston.

Obrador-Cursach (2020) analysed a new Phrygian inscription from Dorylaion, that mentions the gods Miθrapata, Mas Tembrogios and the Pontic Bas. Other attested deities in the Phrygian corpus are Ti- 'Zeus', βας 'the shining one'; and borrowed deities artimitos 'Artemis', mas 'Men' (possibly a moon god) and διουνσιν 'Dionysos'.

== Mythological accounts ==
The name of the earliest known mythical king was Nannacus (aka Annacus). This king resided at Iconium, the most eastern city of the kingdom of Phrygia at that time, and after his death, at the age of 300 years, a great flood overwhelmed the country, as had been foretold by an ancient oracle. The next king mentioned in extant classical sources was called Manis or Masdes. According to Plutarch, because of his splendid exploits, great things were called "manic" in Phrygia. Thereafter, the kingdom of Phrygia seems to have become fragmented among various kings. One of the kings was Tantalus, who ruled over the northwestern region of Phrygia around Mount Sipylus. Tantalus was endlessly punished in Tartarus, because he allegedly killed his son Pelops and sacrificially offered him to the Olympians, a reference to the suppression of human sacrifice. Tantalus was also falsely accused of stealing from the lotteries he had invented. In the mythic age before the Trojan War, during a time of an interregnum, Gordius (or Gordias), a Phrygian farmer, became king, fulfilling an oracular prophecy. The kingless Phrygians had turned for guidance to the oracle of Sabazios ("Zeus" to the Greeks) at Telmissus, in the part of Phrygia that later became part of Galatia. They had been instructed by the oracle to acclaim as their king the first man who rode up to the god's temple in a cart. That man was Gordias (Gordios, Gordius), a farmer, who dedicated the ox-cart in question, tied to its shaft with the "Gordian Knot". Gordias refounded a capital at Gordium in west central Anatolia, situated on the old trackway through the heart of Anatolia that became Darius's Persian "Royal Road" from Pessinus to Ancyra, and not far from the River Sangarius.

Later mythic kings of Phrygia were alternately named Gordias and Midas. Myths surround the first king, Midas. There were seven altogether connecting him with a mythological tale concerning Attis. This shadowy figure resided at Pessinus and attempted to marry his daughter to the young Attis despite the opposition of his mother figure Agdestis and his lover, the goddess Cybele. When Agdestis or Cybele appears and casts madness upon the members of the wedding feast. Midas is said to have died in the ensuing chaos.

The famous king Midas was said to be a son of the king Gordius mentioned above. He is said to have associated himself with Silenus and other satyrs and with Dionysus, who granted him the famous "golden touch".

The mythic Midas of Thrace, accompanied by a band of his people, traveled to Asia Minor to wash away the taint of his unwelcome "golden touch" in the river Pactolus. Leaving the gold in the river's sands, Midas found himself in Phrygia, where he was adopted by the childless king Gordias and taken under the protection of Cybele. Acting as the visible representative of Cybele, and under her authority, it would seem, a Phrygian king could designate his successor.

According to the Iliad, the Phrygians were Trojan allies during the Trojan War. The Phrygia of Homer's Iliad appears to be located in the area that embraced the Ascanian lake and the northern flow of the Sangarius river, and so was much more limited in extent than classical Phrygia. Homer's Iliad also includes a reminiscence by the Trojan king Priam, who had in his youth come to aid the Phrygians against the Amazons (Iliad 3.189). During this episode (a generation before the Trojan War), the Phrygians were said to be led by Otreus and Mygdon. Both appear to be little more than eponyms: there was a place named Otrea on the Ascanian Lake, in the vicinity of the later Nicaea; and the Mygdones were a people of Asia Minor, who resided near Lake Dascylitis (there was also a Mygdonia in Macedonia). During the Trojan War, the Phrygians sent forces to aid Troy, led by Ascanius and Phorcys, the sons of Aretaon. Asius, son of Dymas and brother of Hecabe, is another Phrygian noble who fought before Troy. Quintus Smyrnaeus mentions another Phrygian prince, named Coroebus, son of Mygdon, who fought and died at Troy; he had sued for the hand of the Trojan princess Cassandra in marriage. King Priam's wife Hecabe is usually said to be of Phrygian birth, as a daughter of King Dymas.

The Phrygian Sibyl was the priestess presiding over the Apollonian oracle at Phrygia.

Marsyas, a Phrygian follower of Cybele, was a satyr who is regarded as the inventor of the aulos, which he created using the hollowed antler of a stag. He unwisely competed in music with the Olympian Apollo and inevitably lost, whereupon Apollo flayed Marsyas alive and provocatively hung his skin on Cybele's own sacred tree, a pine.

Herodotus claims the priests of Hephaestus told him a story that the Egyptian pharaoh Psammetichus had two children raised in isolation to find the original language. The children were reported to have uttered bekos meaning "bread" in Phrygian. It was then acknowledged by the Egyptians that the Phrygians were a nation older than the Egyptians.

Josephus claimed the Phrygians were founded by the biblical figure Togarmah, grandson of Japheth and son of Gomer: "and Thrugramma the Thrugrammeans, who, as the Greeks resolved, were named Phrygians".

== See also ==
- Bryges
- Phrygian cap
- Phrygian language
- Paleo-Balkan languages
- Carians
- Mysians
- Lydians
- Lycians
