= Mygdon (king of Phrygia) =

Mythological king of Phyrgia, battled against the Amazons

In Greek mythology, King Mygdon (Ancient Greek: Μύγδων in Greek; gen.: Μύγδονος) of Phrygia, was a son of Acmon and father of Coroebus by his wife Anaximene.

== Mythology ==
Mygdon led a force of Phrygians against the Amazons alongside his aides Otreus (another Phrygian leader) and King Priam of Troy, one generation before the Trojan War. Priam mentions this to Helen of Troy in Book 3 of the Iliad. A part of the Phrygians are said to have been called after him Mygdonians.

Ere now have I journeyed to the land of Phrygia, rich in vines, and there I saw in multitudes the Phrygian warriors, masters of glancing steeds, even the people of Otreus and godlike Mygdon, that were then encamped along the banks of Sangarius. For I, too, being their ally, was numbered among them on the day when the Amazons came, the peers of men. —Homer. Iliad, Book 3, lines 186

I do not know how it is plausible that, after Priam had fought against them [i.e. Amazons] on the side of the Phrygians during the reign of Mygdon, the Amazons later would have come to Ilion as allies —Philostratus the Elder. Heroica, lines 749
