= Mygdonia A.C. =

Greek badminton club

Mygdonia Badminton Athletic Club
- Founded: March 22, 2002
- Based in: Drymos, Thessaloniki
- Home ground: DAK Drymos (capacity: 378)
- Colors: Black, Orange

Mygdonia Badminton Athletic Club (A.C. Badminton Mygdonia) is a badminton club based in Drymos, Oraiokastro, Thessaloniki, Greece. It was started in February 2000 and officially founded on March 22, 2002. Its emblem is an olive wreath, and its colors are orange and black. Mygdonia A.C. has achieved success at both the national and international levels. Many of the club's athletes have received national commendations in various age categories. Some have won the Greek Championship while others have been requested by the national badminton team of Greece.

== History ==
=== Founding and early history ===
Mygdonia A.C. was the first badminton sport club to be based in Drymos, Thessaloniki. The first coach of the team, Evangelia Tetradi, managed to staff the first sections of the academy with children, especially from primary and high school, after several badminton exhibitions at schools in the Mygdonia region. 100 kids were gathered during the debut training of the team. There was high interest in badminton in the region, and the club soon created a charter and officially established. In 2002, Mygdonia A.C. obtained an official form and joined the Hellenic Badminton Federation.

In the club's early years, the athletes of Mygdonia A.C. participated in official contests and friendly tournaments, and the first accomplishments and medals in local school games created optimism for establishment among national leaders. Many new athletes joined the club; the first participants joined between March 31 and April 1, 2001, during the National Greek Championship U-15 at Sidirokastro.

=== First commendations and medals ===
By 2005, a batch of players, who were trained at academy sections, started winning medals at both national and international contests. The work inside the academy during the previous years proved successful, and the first commendations were awarded. The first national champion commendation was achieved by Sotiria Rofalikou in 2005. The next year, Marina Karypidou and Magdalini Tsioumleki received national commendations.

By the late 2000s, the club had matured. Similar awards were later achieved by Maria Marou, Fotini Stavrousi, Eleutheria Giannopoulou, Nikoleta Diamela, and Syntridis Georgios, while Christos Polyzos, Stefanos Galanis, Ioannis Galanis, and Alexandros Varelas managed to enter the quarter-finals of National Individual Championship Contest. Since 2005, the club has amassed a total of more than 40 national championship medals, including several gold medals. Many athletes were asked to join the national badminton team of Greece, and they participated in international contests. Magdalini Tsioumleki won the bronze medal at the Balkan Championship, and Marina Karypidou participated in the European U17 Team Championships 2011 in Portugal.

Athletes who won awards in national contests gained a 10% bonus in higher-level education examinations. This grading is provided by the state.

== Current status ==
Mygdonia A.C. admits children from every age category, including primary and secondary school. Training sessions take place weekly at the Municipal Sports Hall Asterios P. Netsikas in Drymos. Every year, athletes take part in "individual official tournaments"—including the National Senior High school Championship, the Peripheral-Qualified Individual Championship Contest, and the National Individual Championship Contest—in every age category: Under-11, Under-13, Under-15, Under-19, and Men-Women. Athletes also participate in the Greek Association Championship and the unofficial, local Badminton Tournament of Mygdonia. Club athletes travel annually to several towns in Greece to qualify for the official contest of the Greek Badminton Federation (EOFSA). The National Senior High School Championship was first organized in 2014, and Marina Karypidou won the gold medal.

== Sources ==
- Training and facilities
- Mygdonia A.C. report for season 2014–15
- Oraiokastro's Municipality website Archive of local athletic clubs
- Marina Karypidou won gold medal in National Highschool Championship
