= Coroebus =

Greek mythological figures

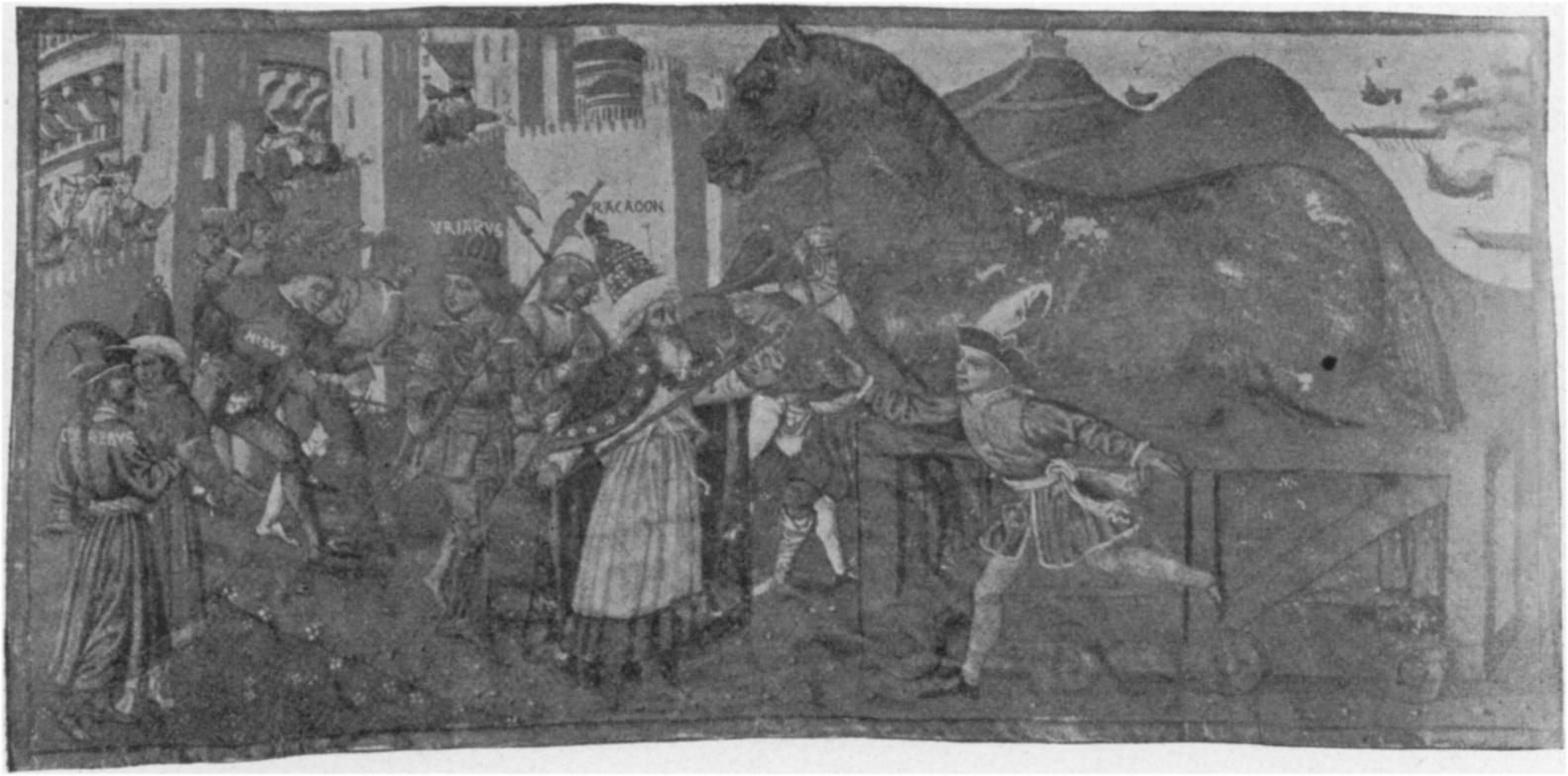
Corebus stands to left in this image.

In Greek mythology, Coroebus (Ancient Greek: Κόροιβος, romanized: Kóroibos) may refer to three distinct characters:

- Coroebus, son of King Mygdon of Phrygia and Axanimene, is a character of Greek legend. He came to the aid of Troy during the Trojan War out of love for Princess Cassandra. During the Sack of Troy, Coroebus convinced some of his fellow soldiers, including Aeneas, to dress in enemy armor to disguise themselves. When he tried to defend Cassandra from rape by Ajax the Lesser, he was killed, either by Peneleos, Diomedes or Neoptolemus.
- Coroebus, a defender of Thebes against the Seven, killed by Parthenopaeus.
- Coroebus, a proverbial fool.
