= Acmonia =

Ancient city in modern Turkey

Coordinates: 38°39′32″N 29°46′17″E

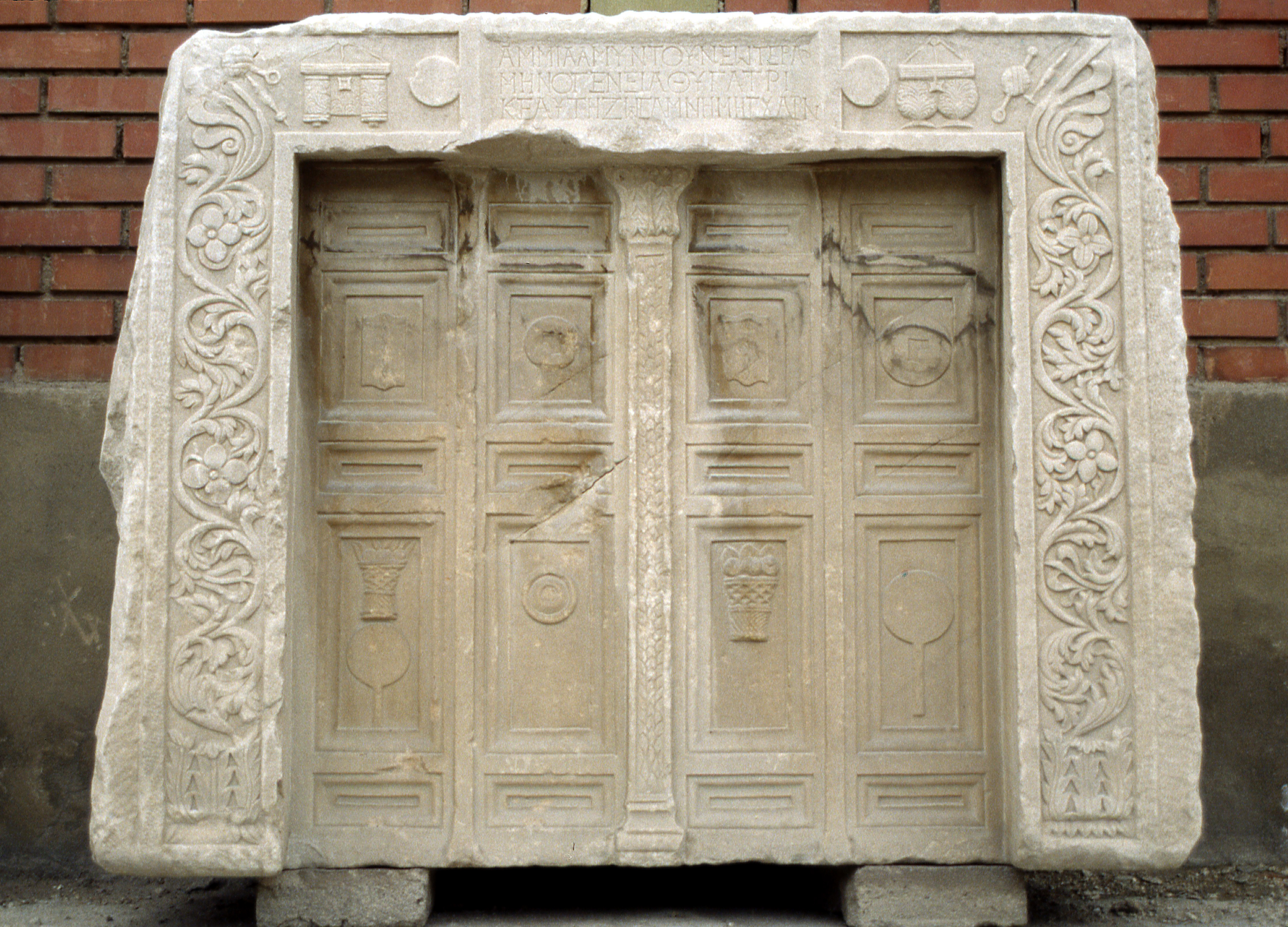
funerary stele from Acmonia

Acmonia or Akmonia (Ancient Greek: Ἀκμονία and Ἀκμόνεια) is an ancient city of Phrygia Pacatiana, in Asia Minor, now known as Ahat Köyü in the district of Banaz, Uşak Province. It is mentioned by Cicero and was a point on the road between Dorylaeum and Philadelphia. Under the Romans, it was within the conventus iuridicus of Apamea.

The city was founded by Akmon (Ἄκμων), son of Maneus.

== Bishopric ==
Acmonia was the seat of a bishop in antiquity. It appears in the Notitiae Episcopatuum from the 10th to the 12th or 13th century. The first bishop whose name is known is Optimus, who was transferred to the metropolitan see of Antiochia in Pisidia before 381. Gennadius took part in the Council of Chalcedon in 451. Theotimus signed in 459 the decree of Patriarch Gennadius I of Constantinople against the simoniacs. Paulus was at the Second Council of Nicaea in 787. Eustathius was a both the Council of Constantinople (869) and the Council of Constantinople (879). Somewhat less certain is the attribution to this diocese of Basilius, who participated in the Third Council of Constantinople in 680. He is recorded as bishop of Κολωνία Πακατιανή (Colonia of the province of Pacatiana) but, as there is no record of such a diocese, it is thought that Κολωνία is a mistake for Ἀκμωνία (Acmonia). No longer a residential bishopric, Acmonia is today listed by the Catholic Church as a titular see.

== Excavations ==
In 2000, a large mosaic floor depicting a gymnasium was discovered in Acmonia. Despite the emergency excavations, which started on 26 June 2000, one part of the mosaic was stolen from the excavation site. The stolen parts were later recovered in Istanbul after a police raid in 2002.

== Jewish community ==
The Jewish synagogue in Acmonia, funded by Ioulia Severa during Nero's reign, stands as the most documented synagogue in Phrygia. where in Nero's reign, Ioulia Severa, a descendant of Galatian royalty, funded its construction. This patronage, however, does not necessarily imply personal sympathy toward Judaism, as it may have been influenced by complex family and official connections. The synagogue leadership was closely aligned with the city's leadership, indicating significant support from influential figures.

While the conditions for Jews in Acmonia seemed favorable during Ioulia Severa's time, it's uncertain if these conditions persisted over subsequent decades. In the third century, there's a notable increase in evidence related to Jews in Acmonia, including gravestones invoking biblical curses against violators of graves. These inscriptions demonstrate the integration of Jewish liturgical practices into the community and suggest that Jewish members held influential positions within the city.

== See also ==
- List of titular sees
