= Return of the Herakleidai =

Ancient Greek myth

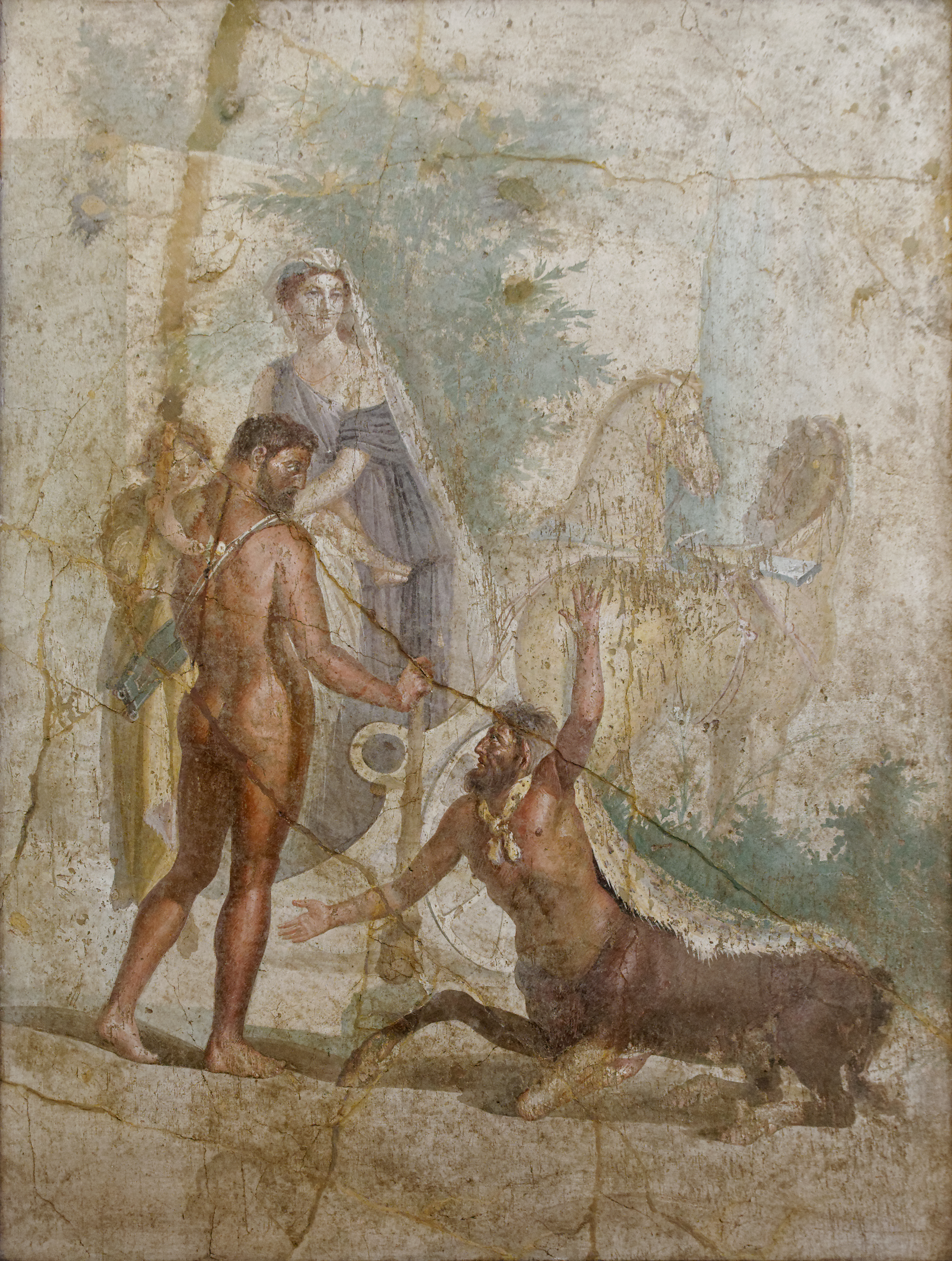
Hyllos, who led the first abortive return of the Herakleidai, held by his father Hercules, (Note: "Hercules" was the name given to Herakles in the Roman tradition.) with his mother Deianira and the centaur Nessus

The Return of the Herakleidai is an ancient Greek myth concerning the return of the descendants of the hero Herakles (the Herakleidai) to the Peloponnese, Herakles's homeland, and their conquest of various realms in the region. In the myth, Herakles was assisted by the Dorians: the story served as an aetiological myth for the Dorian communities of the Peloponnese, particularly Sparta.

According to the myth, Herakles's children were forced from the Peloponnese by Herakles's cousin and enemy Eurystheus; they settled in the northern Greek region of Thessaly, where Hyllos, Herakles's eldest son, formed an allegiance with the Dorians. The Herakleidai killed Eurystheus, with Athenian support and protection, but Hyllos's attempt to retake the Peloponnese ended in failure and his own death in battle. Following the advice of the Oracle of Delphi, Hyllos's great-grandson, Temenos, led his relatives in a successful invasion, fifty years later, with the help of the Dorians and Oxylos. Temenos then divided the kingdoms of the Peloponnese between himself (receiving Argos), his brother Kresphontes (who received Messenia), and Eurysthenes and Prokles, the sons of his brother Aristodemos, who had been killed before the Herakleidai reached the Peloponnese. Eurysthenes and Prokles jointly received the kingdom of Sparta, founding the city's dual royal lineage.

The myth combined the originally unrelated stories of the Herakleidai and the Dorian migration to the Peloponnese. It is likely to have originated at the end of the Early Iron Age (around the eighth century BCE), either in Sparta or in the Argolid, and to have coalesced in its essential form by the fifth century BCE. By the fifth century, the distinctions between these two narratives were blurred, and the Herakleidai were sometimes imagined to have been Dorians themselves. Ancient Greeks believed the events of the myth to have occurred around the end of the age of heroes, shortly after the Trojan War.

The Return of the Herakleidai played an important ideological role in several Greek cities, particularly Sparta, where the city's kings claimed descent and legitimacy from the Herakleidai, and other aristocratic families believed themselves to share Heraclid ancestry. The story also served to assert Sparta's right to its territory in the Peloponnese, and to justify its conquest of Messenia. In Athens, the protection shown to the exiled Herakleidai became a point of civic patriotism, and was invoked by orators, playwrights and the polymath Aristotle. Elsewhere, royal families in Macedonia, Argos, Messene, Lydia and Corinth were considered to be descendants of the Herakleidai, as was Lucius Tarquinius Priscus, traditionally numbered among the kings of Rome.

== Outline of the myth ==
=== Exile of the Herakleidai from the Peloponnese ===
Ancient regions of southern Greece, showing several of the places mentioned in the article. The Peloponnese is the large peninsula just south of centre.

The main narrative of the myth is transmitted by the Bibliotheca, a mythological compendium dated to the first or second century CE, and the works of the first-century BCE historian Diodorus Siculus; details and variants are found in several other fragments of ancient Greek literature. According to the myth, the children of the hero Herakles (the first generation of Herakleidai) were driven after his death from their native Peloponnese by Eurystheus, Herakles's cousin and enemy, who is named as king variously of Argos, Mycenae or Tiryns. (Note: Allan 2001, p. 23. Allan follows Euripides in naming Eurystheus king of Argos: for the alternative accounts, see Blegen 1975, p. 170 (for Mycenae) and Jebb 2015, p. 278 (for Tiryns, following Sophocles). For the familial relationship between Herakles and Eurystheus, see Deacy 2024, p. 144.) They settled in Trachis, in the northern Greek region of Thessaly. In one version of the story, Aigimios, the king and progenitor of the Dorians, adopted Hyllos, Herakles's eldest son, and gave him a third of his kingdom; Hyllos became king of the Dorians after Aigimios's sons voluntarily pledged allegiance to him upon their father's death.

The Herakleidai left Trachis after Eurystheus forced the local king, Keux, to expel them. Thereafter, they claimed sanctuary in Athens by sitting upon the altar of Eleos (the personification of mercy). The Athenians, ruled either by Theseus or his son Demophon, (Note: Grant & Hazel 2004, pp. 215, 276. Theseus is named as the king by Pausanias; Demophon's name is found in the 2nd–3rd century CE account of the mythographer Antoninus Liberalis.) took them in, and allowed them to settle in the town of Trikorythos near Marathon. When the Athenians refused to hand the Herakleidai over to Eurystheus, he attacked Athens in response; following the pronouncement of an oracle that her death would ensure an Athenian victory, Herakles's daughter, Makaria, either offered herself for sacrifice or killed herself. (Note: In the version transmitted by Euripides, the oracle only required that a maiden of noble birth be sacrificed, and Makaria volunteered herself; in Pausanias's account, it was required that the sacrifice be of a daughter of Herakles.) Eurystheus was accordingly defeated; all of his sons were killed, and he retreated towards the Peloponnese.

In some versions, Eurystheus was killed by Iolaos, Herakles's nephew, who pursued him and killed him at the Skironian Rocks on the Isthmus of Corinth. By this point, Iolaos would have been an old man: in the version of the myth told by Euripides's fifth-century BCE play Herakleidai ('Children of Herakles'), he was rejuvenated for a day by the deities Zeus and Hebe (respectively Herakles's father and wife). In another version, known from ancient commentaries on the works of the fifth-century BCE poet Pindar, he had already died, but was resurrected in order to kill Eurystheus. Pindar recounts that Iolaus killed Eurystheus near Thebes, while later accounts, such as that of the Bibliotheca, generally make Hyllos the killer. Euripides's version has Iolaos capture Eurystheus alive and bring him back to Athens, where he is killed, despite the Athenians' protests, on the orders of Herakles's mother, Alkmene. According to Pindar, Hyllos and Aigimios founded the island city of Aegina, near Athens.

Since Herakles was considered to have died before the Trojan War, but the cities eventually ruled by the Herakleidai were believed to have been ruled by descendants of Pelops until several decades afterwards, it was believed that the Herakleidai's return was delayed by destiny. In one version of the myth, Atreus, Eurystheus's successor as king of Mycenae, sent a second army to fight the Herakleidai; Hyllos proposed single combat with any of Atreus's warriors, with the conditions that he would receive the kingdom of Mycenae if he won, and that the Herakleidai would leave the Peloponnese for fifty years if he lost. In this version, he was killed, and the surviving Herakleidai honoured his promise to withdraw. (Note: Durant 2011, citing Diodorus Siculus, 4.58.) Another version, recorded in the Bibliotheca, had Hyllos and his brothers invade the Peloponnese and succeed in taking most of its major cities, only to be forced to retreat by a plague which started a year after their arrival, which was explained by an oracle as a punishment for returning too early. In this version, Hyllos received a prophecy from the Oracle of Delphi that the Herakleidai would be able to return to the Peloponnese "after the third harvest". (Note: Allan 2001, p. 23, citing Pseudo-Apollodorus, 2.8, Herodotus, 9.26 and Diodorus Siculus, 4.57–4.58.) He misinterpreted this as referring to the third year, and invaded Argos. (Note: Chisholm 1911, p. 309; Allan 2001, p. 23, citing Pseudo-Apollodorus, 2.8, Herodotus, 9.26 and Diodorus Siculus, 4.57–4.58.) There, he was killed in single combat by Echemos, king of Tegea, and the Herakleidai were forced to retreat to central Greece. (Note: Allan 2001, p. 23, citing Pseudo-Apollodorus, 2.8, Herodotus, 9.26 and Diodorus Siculus, 4.57–4.58. See also Grant & Hazel 2004, p. 276.)

=== Return to the Peloponnese under Temenos ===
Two further unsuccessful returns followed, led by Hyllos's son Kleodaios and Kleodaios's son Aristomachos. Aristomachos was told by the Oracle of Delphi that the Herakleidai would be able to return "by a narrow passage"; he interpreted this as the Isthmus of Corinth, and was defeated and killed. Aristomachos's son, Temenos, complained to the Delphic oracle that the prophecy had been false, and was told that the "third harvest" referred to had meant that the Herakleidai would return three generations after Hyllos, and that the "narrow passage" referred to the Gulf of Corinth. The Herakleidai built a fleet at Naupaktos, but before it sailed, one of the Herakleidai, Hippotes, killed a prophet of the god Apollo, named by the third-century BCE historian Theopompus as Karnos. (Note: Fowler 2013, p. 335, citing a fragment of Theopompus's work known as FrGH 115 F 357.) As a result, the Herakleidai's fleet was destroyed, their army was hit by a famine, and Temenos's brother Aristodemos was killed (either by lightning, by Apollo, or by being murdered at Delphi). (Note: Chisholm 1911, p. 309 (for lightning or Apollo); Hard 2020, p. 280, citing the Bibliotheca (for lightning) and Pausanias (for murder).) In most versions, Aristodemos was replaced on the expedition by his twin infant sons, Eurysthenes and Prokles, though the fifth-century BCE historian Herodotus reported a version current in Sparta that Aristodemos had not been killed, but led the Herakleidai to that city. (Note: Fowler 2013, p. 335, citing Herodotus 6.52.1. For the age of Prokles and Eurysthenes, see Hard 2020, p. 281.)

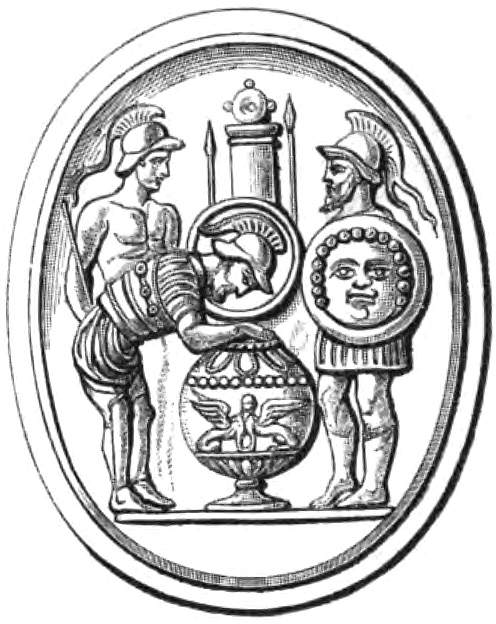
Drawing of a Graeco-Roman engraved gemstone, sometimes considered to depict the drawing of lots between Kresphontes, Eurysthenes and Prokles (Note: Other suggestions include that it depicts a native Italian legend of similar structure to that of the Herakleidai, that it depicts Greek warriors in the Trojan War drawing lots for who will fight the Trojan hero Hector, and that it depicts members of the Seven Against Thebes drawing lots to select which gate of Thebes each will attack. Ingrid Krauskopf points out that the latter two myths generally feature the heroes drawing lots from a helmet, rather than an urn, and that the column in the background would be incongruous in a scene meant to take place on a battlefield.)

Temenos followed the Delphic oracle's instructions to make amends by offering a sacrifice and banishing Hippotes for ten years, and was also told to seek out "the three-eyed one" to act as his guide. Returning from Delphi, Temenos met Oxylos, a man riding a one-eyed horse, correctly interpreted that he was the three-eyed man of which the oracle had spoken. (Note: In some versions, Oxylos himself had only one eye, and his horse had two.) Accompanied by the Dorians, the Herakleidai rebuilt their ships, and followed Oxylos's advice to cross the Gulf of Corinth further to the west, at Molykrion in Aitolia. Once across, they defeated Teisamenos, the king of Mycenae, Argos and Sparta, and so conquered the Peloponnese, fifty years after Hyllos's withdrawal. During the fighting, Aigimios's sons Pamphylos and Dymas were killed. The region of Arkadia was not claimed by the Herakleidai or settled by the Dorians; this was because its king, Kypselos, married his daughter to Temenos's brother Kresphontes to secure an alliance with the Herakleidai.

The Herakleidai claimed the throne of Argos, since Herakles had been a member of the House of Perseus to which Eurystheus and its former kings had belonged, and also claimed the right to rule Sparta and Messenia, since Herakles had previously restored the rightful kings of those cities to their thrones. Temenos became king of Argos, while Kresphontes became king of Messenia and Eurysthenes and Prokles (represented in the draw by their uncle Theras) became kings of Sparta, founding that city's dual royal line. (Note: Allan 2001, p. 23. For Theras, see Hard 2020, p. 281.) The story of the division of the Peloponnesian kingdoms was told in at least two known versions. In one, Oxylos, who had received Elis as his reward for assisting the Herakleidai, allocated the two remaining regions, and gave the better kingdom of Argos to Temenos as the eldest. In another, the younger Herakleidai voluntarily gave Argos to Temenos, and assigned the remaining two kingdoms by lot. A version of the latter myth known in Athens and Ionia in the fifth century BCE held that Kresphontes cheated in the draw, which consisted of drawing lots from an urn filled with water. In the variation preserved by the second-century CE writer Pausanias, two clay lots were available, one dried in the sun and one dried by fire: Kresphontes persuaded Temenos to grant him the fire-dried lot, which was not dissolved by the water while the air-dried lot was, and therefore was granted first choice. (Note: Nagy 2019a, citing Pausanias, 4.3.3–4.3.5.) In an alternative retelling made in the Bibliotheca, Kresphontes swapped his stone lot for a clod of earth, which dissolved in the water, and therefore left him with his desired Messenia after the other lots were drawn for Argos and Sparta. (Note: Nagy 2019a, citing Pseudo-Apollodorus, 2.8.4.) (Note: According to the Bibliotheca, the kingdom of Argos was also assigned by lot.)

== Origins and development ==
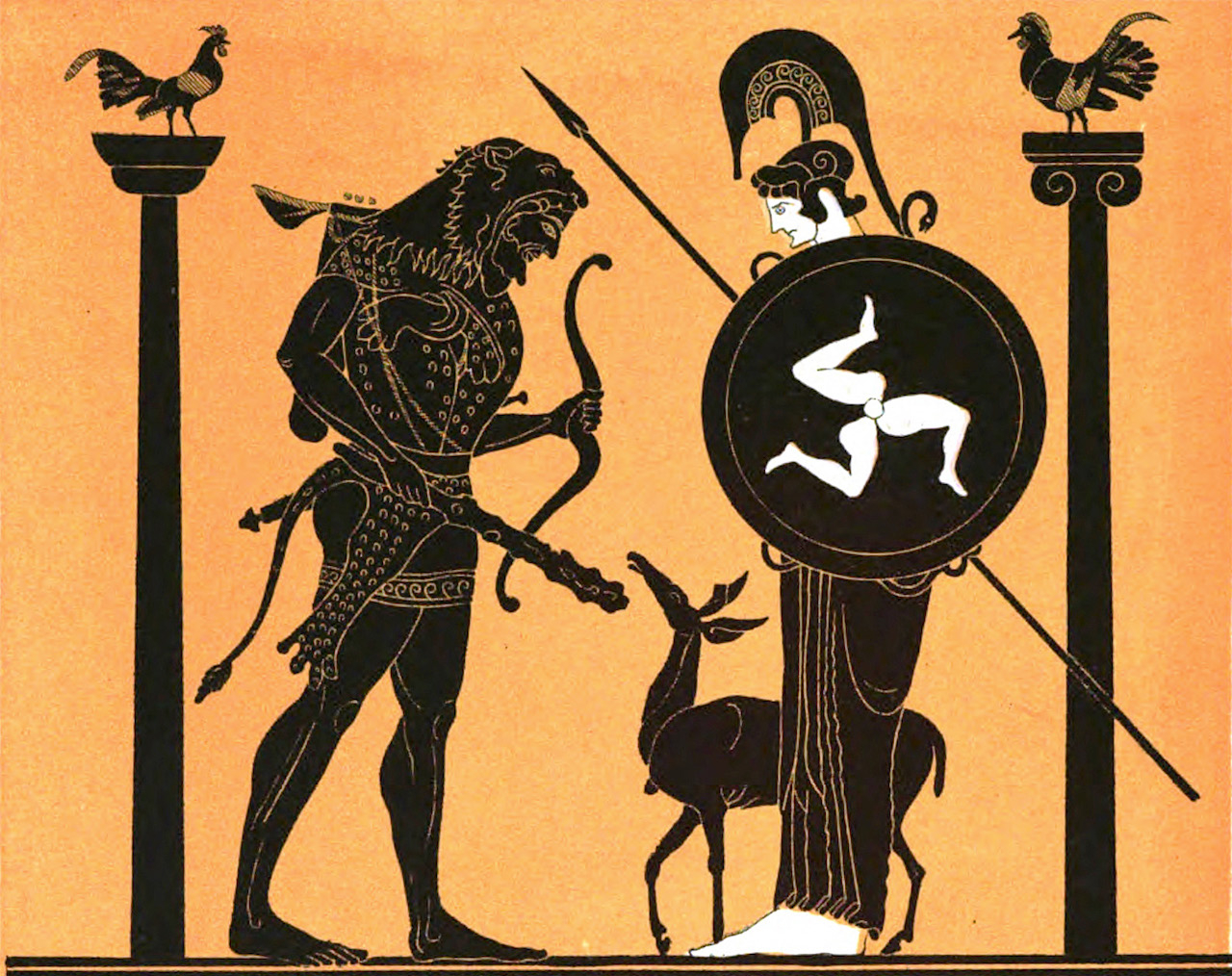
Drawing by Eduard Gerhard of a late sixth-century BCE Greek amphora, showing Herakles (left) with Athena. Behind Herakles is a column of the Doric order; behind Athena is one of the Ionic order, showing the association between Herakles and Dorian identity.

The myth of the Return of the Herakleidai combined earlier mythic traditions concerning the Dorians and the descendants of Herakles. Outside the Peloponnese (for example, on Rhodes, Kos, and Crete), narratives are known from the eighth century BCE which cast the sons of Herakles as the ancestral founders of communities, but did not connect them to the Dorians. The Peloponnesian version of the myth, in which the Herakleidai were seen as "returning" to their ancestral homeland, appears to have originated around the eighth century BCE, at the end of the Early Iron Age, (Note: Allan 2001, p. 25; Hall 2013, p. 241. On the terminology and absolute dating of the Early Iron Age, see Bintliff 2012, pp. 209–210 and Murray 2018, pp. 20–21.) either in Sparta or the Argolid. (Note: Allan 2001, p. 25; Kennell 2010, p. 23 (for Sparta); Hall 1997, p. 62; Luraghi 2008, p. 53 (for the Argolid).) By the time of Herodotus (that is, the mid–fifth century BCE), the stories of the Dorian migration into the Peloponnese (the "Dorian invasion") and the Return of the Herakleidai had been fused into a single narrative.

The first literary attestation of the myth of the Return of the Herakleidai, which combines it with that of the Dorian invasion, is in the work of the seventh-century BCE Spartan poet Tyrtaeus. Tyrtaeus wrote of the Spartans as having arrived in the land of Laconia from Erineus, in northern Greece, with the Herakleidai. (Note: Allan 2001, p. 23 and Hall 2013, p. 241, both citing Tyrtaeus, fragment 2. For the combination with the Dorian Invasion, see Fowler 2013, p. 341.) William Allan suggests that the part of the myth where the Herakleidai seek refuge in Athens was developed later, as a means by which Athens could appropriate the story and the prestige associated with the connection to Herakles. The episode with Keux, in which Eurystheus forces the Herakleidai to leave Trachis, is first attested in the work of the historian Heketaios of Miletos, who wrote around 500 BCE. The developed form of the Herakleidai myth appears to have existed in its essential aspects by the fifth century BCE, though the most detailed surviving treatments of it are that of the Bibliotheca and of Diodorus Siculus, who wrote in the first century BCE.

Ancient Greeks dated the Return of the Herakleidai around the end of the age of heroes (roughly the Late Bronze Age or the late second millennium BCE), shortly after the Trojan War. The fifth-century BCE historian Thucydides dated it to eighty years after the fall of Troy; (Note: Allan 2001, p. 23; Cline 2024, pp. 1, 3, citing Thucydides, 1.12.3. For the date in Thucydides, see Hall 2013, p. 240.) Pausanias accounted it as two generations after the same event. (Note: Thomas & Conant 1999, p. 42, referencing Pausanias, 4.3.3.) Gregory Nagy has suggested that the story of Kresphontes and his fire-dried lot may be an echo of Bronze Age Mycenaean administrative practices, by which goods and personnel were recorded upon clay tablets and sealings.

The term used for the Herakleidai's return by Herodotus is kathodos, which can mean both "descent" and "return from exile". There were several versions of the myth, current in different Doric communities around the Greek world: all held that the Herakleidai had been given divine sanction to come into their kingdoms, though the narrative of return-from-exile appears to have been restricted to those in the Peloponnese, and to have been particularly prominent in Sparta. By the sixth century BCE, the ethnic divisions between the Herakleidai and the Dorians were often elided, such that the Herakleidai and Herakles himself were often imagined to be Dorians, and the Dorian invasion of the Peloponnese to be conceived of as a homeward journey. Similarly, the term "Return of the Herakleidai" was often used to refer to the mythical migration of the Dorians into the Peloponnese.

== Role in civic identity ==
=== In Sparta ===
The narrative of the Return of the Herakleidai was particularly important in Sparta, where it formed the city's foundation myth. The two Spartan royal lines – the Agiad and Eurypontid dynasties – claimed legitimacy into the classical period through their descent from Herakles. Other, non-royal aristocratic lineages, such as that of the fifth-century BCE general Lysander, also claimed Heraclid descent as a mark of distinction, and Spartan aristocrats in general could be referred to as the "progeny of Herakles", though most Spartans did not consider themselves his direct descendants.

The version of the myth used in Sparta seems to have been a pastiche of various often-contradictory mythical narratives: Nigel Kennell has called it "drastically underwritten" and likely to have developed in Laconia itself. Functionally, the involvement of the Herakleidai combined with the story of the Dorian invasion to assert Sparta's right to its territory in the Peloponnese, since the Dorians themselves had no ancestral connection to the Peloponnese. The accounts of Kresphontes's cheating in the drawing of lots, resulting in his rule over Messenia, have also been considered as a means of legitimising or excusing Sparta's conquest of the region in the historical period. The belief that the draw had been unfair also provided an explanation for the long-standing hostility between Sparta and Argos.

According to Herodotus, the myth played a prominent role in a debate before the Battle of Plataia in 479 BCE, where the Tegeans and Athenians argued over which should take the right-hand position – to which was accorded the greatest prestige – in the line of the Spartan-led force. In Herodotus's narrative, the Tegeans drew upon the victory of Echemos over Hyllos to demonstrate their ability to defend the Peloponnese from invaders, while the Athenians invoked the protection given to the Herakleidai by their ancestors: the Spartans decided in favour of the Athenians.

=== In Athens and elsewhere ===
In Athens, the myth became a focus of civic patriotism: the classicist Matthew Leigh has called it, along with the story of Theseus's recovery of the bodies of the Seven against Thebes, one of Athens's proudest stories. In the fourth century BCE, it was widely cited by orators and was mentioned as a paradigmatic story of Athens's glorious history by Aristotle. The myth was the subject of three plays by the fifth-century Athenian playwright Euripides: the extant Herakleidai ('Children of Herakles') and the lost Temenos and Temenidai ('Descendants of Temenos'). It may also have featured in now-lost epic poems known to Herodotus, and been the subject of a lost play, titled the Herakleidai, by Euripides's approximate contemporary Aeschylus. The version of the myth where Eurystheus is captured alive and killed on Alkmene's orders may have been invented by Euripides.

The Temenid royal dynasty of Macedon also used the myth in their aetiological narratives, claiming descent via Temenos, as did the Temenid dynasty of Argos. Similar claims were made by the rulers of Messene. According to Herodotus, an ancient dynasty of kings of Lydia, beginning with Agron, were also descended from the Herakleidai. The Bacchiad dynasty, which ruled Corinth until around 657 BCE, also claimed Heraclid descent, and were said to have been the ancestors of the kings of Lynkestis, a region of Upper Macedonia, and of Lucius Tarquinius Priscus, traditionally numbered among the kings of Rome. (Note: On the historicity of the kings of Rome, see Smith 2011, pp. 25, 35.) During the Roman civil wars of the first century BCE, a series of gems were commissioned probably depicting the drawing of lots between Kresphontes, Eurysthenes and Prokles; Erika Simon has suggested that these may have alluded to the prospect of post-war divisions of land, either to pay off veterans or between the competing leaders. In support of this, Francesco Carotta notes that one of the warring triumvirs, Mark Antony, claimed to be of Heraclid descent.

== Bibliography ==
=== Ancient sources ===
- Diodorus Siculus. Library – via Perseus Digital Library.
- Herodotus. Histories – via Perseus Digital Library.
- Pausanias. Description of Greece – via Perseus Digital Library.
- Pseudo-Apollodorus. Library – via Perseus Digital Library.
- Thucydides. History of the Peloponnesian War – via Perseus Digital Library.
- Fragments of Tyrtaeus in Gerber, Douglas E., ed. (1999). Tyrtaeus, Solon, Theognis, Mimnermus: Greek Elegiac Poetry: From the Seventh to the Fifth Centuries BC. Loeb Classical Library. Vol. 258. Cambridge, Massachusetts: Harvard University Press. ISBN 0-674-99582-1.

=== Modern sources ===
- Allan, William (2001). Introduction. The Children of Heracles. By Euripides. Allan, William (ed.). Oxford: Aris & Phillips. pp. 21–58. ISBN 978-0-85668-741-9.
- Bintliff, John (2012). The Complete Archaeology of Greece: From Hunter-Gatherers to the 20th Century AD. Chichester: Wiley. doi:10.1002/9781118255179. ISBN 978-1-4051-5418-5.
- Blegen, Carl W. (1975). "The Expansion of the Mycenaean Civilisation". In Edwards, I. E. S.; Gadd, C. J.; Hammond, N. G. L.; Sollberger, E. (eds.). The Cambridge Ancient History. Vol. 2, Part 2 (3rd ed.). Cambridge University Press. pp. 165–187. ISBN 0-521-08691-4.
- Bremmer, Jan N. (1997). "Myth as Propaganda: Athens and Sparta". Zeitschrift für Papyrologie und Epigraphik. 117: 9–17. ISSN 0084-5388. JSTOR 20189993.
- Carotta, Francesco (2013). "Triumviri come Eraclidi su gemme italiche? Considerazioni complementari su 'Oxilo e la terza generazione degli Eraclidi' di Erika Simon" [Triumvirs as Heraclids on Italic Gems? Additional considerations on "Oxylos and the Third Generation of Heraclids" by Erika Simon] (PDF). Numismata e anticità classiche (in Italian). 42: 85–91. ISSN 1420-1739.
- Chisholm, Hugh (1911). "Heraclidae" . In Chisholm, Hugh (ed.). Encyclopædia Britannica (11th ed.). Cambridge University Press. pp. 308–309. OCLC 266598.
- Cline, Eric H. (2024). After 1177 BC: The Survival of Civilisations. Princeton and Oxford: Princeton University Press. ISBN 978-0-691-19213-0. LCCN 2023022187.
- Davies, Philip John Victor (2018). "Plutarch, Lysander and a Disappearing Heraclid Reform". Greek, Roman and Byzantine Studies. 58: 523–541. ISSN 2159-3159.
- Deacy, Susan (2024). "Down the Sinkhole: The Lernaean Hydra". In Felton, Debbie (ed.). The Oxford Handbook of Monsters in Classical Myth. Oxford University Press. pp. 138–147. doi:10.1093/oxfordhb/9780192896506.001.0001. ISBN 978-0-19-289650-6.
- Durant, Will (2011) [1939]. The Life of Greece. The Story of Civilization. Vol. 2 (eBook ed.). New York: Simon and Schuster. OCLC 1150244512.
- Fowler, Robert L. (2013). Early Greek Mythography. Vol. 2: Commentary. Oxford University Press. ISBN 978-0-19-814741-1.
- Grant, Michael; Hazel, John (2004). Who's Who in Classical Mythology. London and New York: Taylor & Francis. ISBN 1-134-50943-X.
- Hall, Jonathan M. (1997). Ethnic Identity in Greek Antiquity. Cambridge University Press. doi:10.1017/cbo9780511605642. ISBN 0-521-78999-0.
- Hall, Jonathan M. (2002). Hellenicity: Between Ethnicity and Culture. University of Chicago Press. ISBN 0-226-31330-1.
- Hall, Jonathan M. (2007). A History of the Archaic Greek World, ca 1000–479 BCE. Wiley-Blackwell. ISBN 978-1-118-30127-2.
- Hall, Jonathan M. (2013). "Dorians". In Wilson, Nigel (ed.). Encyclopedia of Ancient Greece. New York: Taylor and Francis. doi:10.4324/9780203958766. ISBN 978-1-136-78800-0.
- Hard, Robin (2020). The Routledge Handbook of Greek Mythology (8th ed.). London and New York: Routledge. ISBN 978-1-138-65260-6.
- Howatson, Margaret C., ed. (2013). "Heracleidae". The Oxford Companion to Classical Literature (3rd ed.). Oxford University Press. pp. 283–284. ISBN 978-0-19-954855-2.
- Hsu, Katherine Lu (24 October 2024). "Heracles". Oxford Bibliographies. Oxford University Press. doi:10.1093/obo/9780195389661-0198. ISBN 978-0-19-538966-1.
- Jebb, Richard C. (2015) [1904]. The Tragedies of Sophocles. Cambridge University Press. ISBN 978-1-107-58560-7.
- Kennell, Nigel M. (2010). Spartans: A New History. Chichester: Wiley. ISBN 978-1-4443-6053-0.
- Leigh, Matthew (2013). From Polypragmon to Curiosus: Ancient Concepts of Curious and Meddlesome Behaviour. Oxford University Press. ISBN 978-0-19-966861-8.
- Luraghi, Nino (2008). The Ancient Messenians: Constructions of Ethnicity and Memory. Cambridge University Press. doi:10.1017/CBO9780511481413. ISBN 978-0-511-48141-3.
- Krauskopf, Ingrid (1994). "Septem". Lexicon Iconographicum Mythologiae Classicae [Iconographical Dictionary of Classical Mythology] (in German). Vol. 7.1. Zurich: Artemis Verlag. pp. 730–748. ISBN -3-7608-8751-1 – via Internet Archive.
- Malkin, Irad (1994). Myth and Territory in the Spartan Mediterranean. Cambridge University Press. ISBN 0-521-41183-1.
- March, Jennifer (2014). Dictionary of Classical Mythology. Oxford: Oxbow Books. ISBN 978-1-78297-636-3.
- Murray, Sarah C. (2018). "Lights and Darks: Data, Labeling, and Language in the History of Scholarship on Early Greece". Hesperia. 87 (1): 17–54. doi:10.2972/hesperia.87.1.0017. JSTOR 10.2972/hesperia.87.1.0017.
- Nagy, Gregory (8 November 2019). "Thinking comparatively about Greek mythology XVI, with a focus on Dorians led by kingly 'sons' of Hēraklēs the kingmaker". Classical Inquiries. Center for Hellenic Studies, Harvard University.
- Nagy, Gregory (15 November 2019). "Thinking comparatively about Greek mythology XVII, with placeholders that stem from a conversation with Tom Palaima, starting with this question: was Hēraklēs a Dorian?". Classical Inquiries. Center for Hellenic Studies, Harvard University.
- Parker, Robert Christopher Townley (1999). "Heraclidae". In Hornblower, Simon; Spawforth, Anthony (eds.). The Oxford Classical Dictionary (Third ed.). Oxford University Press. p. 686. ISBN 0-19-866172-X.
- Salmon, John (2012). "Bacchiadae". In Hornblower, Simon; Spawforth, Anthony; Eidinow, Esther (eds.). The Oxford Classical Dictionary (4th ed.). Oxford University Press. p. 220. ISBN 978-0-19-954556-8.
- Smith, Christopher (2011). "Thinking About Kings". Bulletin of the Institute of Classical Studies. 54 (2): 21–42. doi:10.1111/j.2041-5370.2011.00022.x. JSTOR 43694086.
- Sommerstein, Alan H., ed. (2009). Aeschylus: Fragments. Loeb Classical Library. Vol. 505. Cambridge, Massachusetts: Harvard University Press. ISBN 978-0-674-99629-8.
- Thomas, Carol G.; Conant, Craig (1999). Citadel to City-State: The Transformation of Greece, 1200–700 BCE. Bloomington: Indiana University Press. ISBN 0-253-33496-9.
- Vannicelli, Pietro (2007) [2001]. "Herodotus's Egypt and the Foundations of Universal History". In Luraghi, Nino (ed.). The Historian's Craft in the Age of Herodotus. Oxford University Press. ISBN 978-0-19-921511-9.
