= Dymas =

Greek mythological figures

In Greek mythology, Dymas (Ancient Greek: Δύμας) is the name attributed to the following individuals:

- Dymas, a Mariandynian who warned the Argonauts about the cruelty of Amycus, king of the Bebrycians. Both Mariandynians and Bebrycians lived in northwestern Asia Minor.
- Dymas, a soldier who fought on the side of the Seven against Thebes. He took part in the foot-race at Opheltes' funeral games in Nemea. Dymas was wounded in battle and killed himself when the enemy started questioning him.
- Dymas, a Dorian and the ancestor of the Dymanes. His father, Aegimius, adopted Heracles' son, Hyllas. Dymas and his brother, Pamphylus, submitted to Hyllas.
- Dymas, king of Phrygia and father of Hecuba.
- Dymas, perhaps the same as the first. According to Quintus Smyrnaeus this Dymas was the father of Meges, a Trojan whose sons fought at Troy.
- Dymas, an Aulian warrior who came to fight at Troy under the leadership of Archesilaus. He died at the hands of Aeneas.
- Dymas, a Trojan soldier who fought with Aeneas and was killed at Troy.
- Dymas, was mentioned in Homer's Odyssey as a Phaeacian captain, whose daughter was a friend to the princess Nausicaa.
