= Rhium (Messenia) =

Rhium or Rhion (Ancient Greek: Ῥίον) was a town of ancient Messenia, in the Thuriate Gulf, and also the name of one of the five divisions into which the mythical Cresphontes is said to have divided Messenia. Strabo describes Rhium as over against Taenarum (ἀπεναντίον Ταινάρον), which is not a very accurate expression, as hardly any place on the western coast, except the vicinity of Cape Acritas, is in sight from Taenarum.

Its site is unlocated.
