= Archelaus (Heraclid) =

Ancient Greek mythological figure

Archelaus (Ancient Greek: Ἀρχέλαος, lit. 'leading the people, chief') was in Greek mythology a son of Temenus, a Heraclid, who, when expelled by his brothers, fled to king Cisseus in Macedonia.

Cisseus promised him the succession to his throne and the hand of his daughter, if he would assist him against his neighboring enemies. Archelaus performed what was asked of him; but when, after the defeat of the enemy, he claimed the fulfillment of the promise, Cisseus had a hole dug in the earth, filled it with burning coals, and covered it over with branches, that Archelaus might fall into it. The plan was discovered, and Cisseus himself was thrown into the pit by Archelaus, who then fled, but at the command of Apollo built the town of Aegae on a spot to which he was led by a goat.

According to some accounts, Alexander the Great was a descendant of Archelaus. Two other mythical personages of this name occur in the Bibliotheca.

There is a play telling the story of Archelaus, titled Archelaus, by Euripides.
