= Eurysthenes =

Mythical king of Sparta

- Basileus (king) of Sparta
- Reign: c. 1104 – 1066 BC
- Predecessor: Aristodemus?
- Successor: Agis I
- Consort: Lathria
- House: Heraclids
- Father: Aristodemus
- Mother: Argia

Eurysthenes (Greek: Εὐρυσθένης, romanized: Eurusthénēs, "widely ruling") was king of Sparta and one of the Heracleidae in Greek mythology. He was a son of Aristodemus and Argia, daughter of Autesion. He had a twin brother, Procles. Together they received the land of Lacedaemon after Cresphontes, Temenus and Aristodemus defeated Tisamenus, the last Achaean king of the Peloponnesus. Eurysthenes married Lathria, daughter of Thersander, King of Kleonae, sister of his sister-in-law Anaxandra, and was the father of his successor, Agis I, founder of the Agiad dynasty of the Kings of Sparta.

The title of archēgetēs, "founding magistrate," was explicitly denied to Eurysthenes and Procles by the later Spartan government on the grounds that they were not founders of a state, but were maintained in their offices by parties of foreigners. Instead the honor was granted to their son and grandson, for which reason the two lines were called the Agiads and the Eurypontids.

== Legend of the double kingship ==
The story of the double kingship of Sparta begins with the invasion of the Peloponnesus by the Dorians, and the Aetolian allies, under three Heraclid commanders, Temenus, Cresphontes and Aristodemus, the three sons of Aristomachus. Karl Otfried Müller collected and evaluated the various fragments of the story from classical authors. According to Müller, the state of Elis in Arcadia, allies of the Aetolians, provided a guide (Oxylus) for passage through Arcadia after crossing the Gulf of Corinth from Naupactus. Arcadia gave them a central point from which to attack anywhere else in the Peloponnesus. Their presence was contested by a united Peloponnesian Achaean army (except for Arcadia) under Tisamenus, an Atreid. The Achaeans lost. They were commanded to evacuate to Athens, but many did not; furthermore, much of the region remained unconquered.

Nevertheless, the three commanders divided that which they did not yet possess, Peloponnesus. Following the signs of the gods, Aristodemus received Sparta. There is a question as to whether he ever was actually in possession there. One tradition says that he was and was therefore the first king of Sparta. A second asserts that he died before taking possession and that the Dorians brought his infant twin sons to Sparta as kings under a regent. Aristodemus was assassinated at Delphi by the Atreids. He had not even had time to designate a successor. The mother did not know which was the elder. The oracle at Delphi resolved the problem by suggesting that they both be made kings, which is the origin of the dual monarchy. Theras, Argeia's brother, was made regent. There was still a necessity of designating the elder. They chose the one the mother fed and cleaned first, Eurysthenes.

== Dates of the reigns of the first ten kings of the Agiad line ==
The untimely death of Aristodemus with other events has served as some basis for dating the reigns of the first ten kings of Sparta in the line known by state definition as the Agiad. The Return of the Heracleidae, which is the closest event to a Dorian Invasion available in legend, must coincide with the entry of Aristodemus and his brethren into Arcadia, which, based on the chronology of Eratosthenes, happened 328 years before the generally accepted date of the first year of the first Olympiad, 776 BC. Eratosthenes's date is therefore 1104 BC. This must be the year of Aristodemus's military activity in Arcadia, his fatherhood and his assassination. Eurysthenes was therefore born in 1104 BC, which was the first year of his reign, if the regency of Theras is discounted.

Pausanias states that the end of the First Messenian War was the first year of the 14th Olympiad. The date must have been 724/723 BC if the first year of the first Olympiad was 776/775 BC. Kings Polydorus of the Agiads and Theopompus of the Eurypontids were reigning at that time, roughly in mid-reign. The end of the war must be 379 years from the return of the Heraclids. According to Isaac Newton, also a classical scholar, the ten kings reigned an average of 38 years each, which can be used as an estimator of the dates. Eurysthenes would have ruled in 1104–1066 BC, with an unknown margin of error, as much of the data is relatively uncertain.

== See also ==
- List of kings of Sparta

== Bibliography ==
- Müller, Karl Otfried (1830). The history and antiquities of the Doric race. Vol. I. Translated by George Cornewall Lewis; Henry Tufnell. London: J. Murray.

Preceded by Aristodemus?	King of Sparta c. 1104 – c. 1066 B.C.	Succeeded by Agis I
