= Pamphylus (mythology) =

Dorian hero in Greek mythology

Northern and central Greece, showing regions mentioned in the article

In Greek mythology, Pamphylus (Ancient Greek: Πάμφυλος) was a Dorian hero. He was considered to be the eponymous hero of one of the three tribes (phylai) of the Dorians, the Pamphyloi; (Note: Dowden 2005, pp. 51–52, citing Pseudo-Apollodorus 2.8.3.) his brothers, Dymas and Hyllos, were associated with the remaining two. Originally, these three heroes were identified as the sons of Doros, after whom the Dorians are named, but by at least the sixth century BCE they were considered to be the sons of Aigimios, who was himself considered to be Doros's son.

The classicist Jonathan M. Hall suggests that the change of Pamphylus's parentage served to reconcile two versions of the myth of the Dorians' origins: one, current in Sparta, considered them to originate in Erineus in the central Greek region of Doris, while another considered that they had once lived in Histiaeotis in the northern Greek region of Thessaly under a king named Aigimios. In turn, this genealogy served to reconcile the myth of the Dorian migration into the Peloponnese, a region of southern Greece, with that of the Herakleidae (descendants of the hero Herakles), who were believed to have led that migration and to have been given rulership over several Peloponnesian kingdoms as a result.

In the most common version of the myth, Aigimios adopted Hyllos, who was the son of the hero Herakles. After Aigimios's death, Pamphylos and his brother, Dymas, submitted to Hyllos, making Hyllos king of the Dorians. Pamphylos was killed, alongside Dymas, when Hyllos's great-grandson Temenos led the Dorians and Herakleidai on their successful invasion of the Peloponnese. Other than the manner of their deaths, there is no recorded mythical tradition about the lives or deeds of Pamphylos and Dymas.

== Works cited ==
=== Ancient sources ===
- Pseudo-Apollodorus (1921). Bibliotheca (The Library). Translated by Frazer, James George. Cambridge, Massachusetts: Harvard University Press. ISBN 0-674-99135-4 – via Perseus Digital Library. Greek text available from the same website.

=== Modern sources ===
- Chisholm, Hugh (1911). "Heraclidae" . In Chisholm, Hugh (ed.). Encyclopædia Britannica (11th ed.). Cambridge University Press. pp. 308–309. OCLC 266598.
- Dowden, Ken (2005) [1992]. The Uses of Greek Mythology. London and New York: Routledge. ISBN 1-134-92628-6.
- Fowler, Robert L. (2013). Early Greek Mythography. Vol. 2: Commentary. Oxford University Press. ISBN 978-0-19-814741-1.
- Hall, Jonathan M. (1997). Ethnic Identity in Greek Antiquity. Cambridge University Press. doi:10.1017/cbo9780511605642. ISBN 0-521-78999-0.
- Nilsson, Martin P. (1986). Cults, Myths, Oracles and Politics in Ancient Greece. Göteborg: Paul Åström. OCLC 2731467 – via Internet Archive.
