= Hyllus =

Mythical Greek character

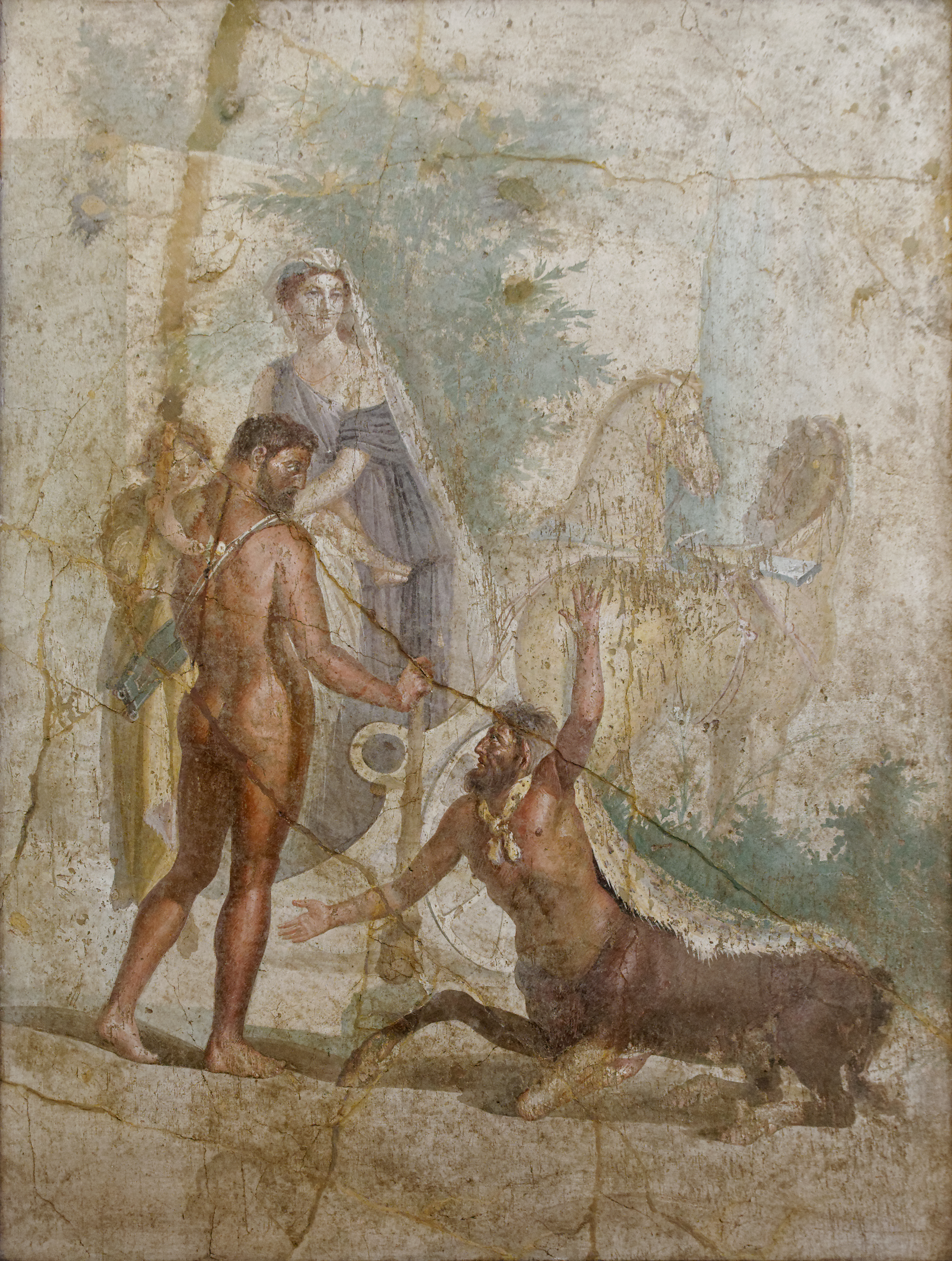
Hercules, holding Hyllus, and Deianira meet the centaur Nessus, who will attempt to rape Deianira when he helps her to cross the river

In Greek mythology, Hyllus (/ˈhɪləs/; Ancient Greek: Ὕλλος, Hyllos) or Hyllas (Ὕλλᾱς, Hyllas) was a son of Heracles and Deianira and the husband of Iole.

== Mythology ==
Heracles, whom Zeus had originally intended to be ruler of Argos, Lacedaemon and Messenian Pylos, had been supplanted by the cunning of Hera, and his intended possessions had fallen into the hands of Eurystheus, king of Mycenae. After the death of Heracles, his children, after many wanderings, found refuge from Eurystheus at Athens. Eurystheus, on his demand for their surrender being refused, attacked Athens, but was defeated and slain.

Hyllus and his brothers invaded Peloponnesus, but after a year's stay were forced by a pestilence to quit.

They withdrew to Thessaly, where Aegimius, the mythical ancestor of the Dorians, whom Heracles had assisted in war against the Lapidae, adopted Hyllus and made over to him a third part of his territory. After the death of Aegimius, his two sons, Pamphylus and Dymas, voluntarily submitted to Hyllus (who was, according to the Dorian tradition in Herodotus V. 72, really an Achaean), who thus became ruler of the Dorians, the three branches of that race being named after these three heroes. Being desirous of reconquering his paternal inheritance, Hyllus consulted the Delphic oracle, which told him to wait for "the third fruit," and then enter Peloponnesus by "a narrow passage by sea."

Accordingly, after three years, Hyllus marched across the isthmus of Corinth to attack Atreus, the successor of Eurystheus, but was slain in single combat by Echemus, king of Tegea. This second attempt was followed by a third under his son Cleodaeus and a fourth under his grandson Aristomachus, both of which were equally unsuccessful. At last, Temenus, Cresphontes and Aristodemus, the sons of Aristomachus, complained to the oracle that its instructions had proved fatal to those who had followed them. They received the answer that by the "third fruit" the "third generation" was meant, and that the "narrow passage" was not the isthmus of Corinth, but the straits of Rhium.

They accordingly built a fleet at Naupactus, but before they set sail, Aristodemus was struck by lightning (or shot by Apollo) and the fleet destroyed, because one of the Heracleidae had slain an Acarnanian soothsayer. The oracle, being again consulted by Temenus, bade him offer an expiatory sacrifice and banish the murderer for ten years, and look out for a man with three eyes to act as guide. On his way back to Naupactus, Temenus fell in with Oxylus, an Aetolian, who had lost one eye, riding on a horse (thus making up the three eyes) and immediately pressed him into his service. According to another account, a mule on which Oxylus rode had lost an eye.

The Heracleidae repaired their ships, sailed from Naupactus to Antirrhium, and thence to Rhium in Peloponnesus. A decisive battle was fought with Tisamenus, son of Orestes, the chief ruler in the peninsula, who was defeated and slain. The Heracleidae, who thus became practically masters of Peloponnesus, proceeded to distribute its territory among themselves by lot. Argos fell to Temenus, Lacedaemon to Procles and Eurysthenes, the twin sons of Aristodemus; and Messene to Cresphontes. The fertile district of Elis had been reserved by agreement for Oxylus.

The Heracleidae ruled in Lacedaemon until 221 BC, but disappeared much earlier in the other countries. This conquest of Peloponnesus by the Dorians, commonly called the "Return of the Heracleidae," is represented as the recovery by the descendants of Heracles of the rightful inheritance of their hero ancestor and his sons. The Dorians followed the custom of other Greek tribes in claiming as ancestor for their ruling families one of the legendary heroes, but the traditions must not on that account be regarded as entirely mythical. They represent a joint invasion of Peloponnesus by Aetolians and Dorians, the latter having been driven southward from their original northern home under pressure from the Thessalians.

It is noticeable that there is no mention of these Heracleidae or their invasion in Homer or Hesiod. Herodotus (vi. 52) speaks of poets who had celebrated their deeds, but these were limited to events immediately succeeding the death of Heracles. The story was first amplified by the Greek tragedians, who probably drew their inspiration from local legends, which glorified the services rendered by Athens to the rulers of Peloponnesus.

After Heracles was poisoned by Deianira, Heracles charged Hyllus to marry Iole when he came of age. Hyllus and Iole had a son Cleodaeus, and three daughters, Evaechme, Aristaechme, and Hyllis.
