= Meges (mythology) =

List of greek figures named Mégês

In Greek mythology, Mégês (Ancient Greek: Μέγης) may refer to the following figures:

- Meges, defender of Thebes against the Seven Against Thebes.
- Meges, son of Phyleus and one of the Achaean Leaders.
- Meges, father of Polymnius, a Trojan warrior.
- Meges, a wealthy Trojan and son of Dymas. He married Periboea who bore him sons: Celtus and Eubius, both participated in the Trojan War.
