= Echemus =

Tegean king of Arcadia who succeeded Lycurgus in Greek mythology

In Greek mythology, Echemus (/ˈɛkəməs/; Ancient Greek: Ἔχεμος, romanized: Ekhemos, lit. 'having/ holding fast' or 'steadfast') was the Tegean king of Arcadia who succeeded Lycurgus. His name was derived from the Greek verb ἔχω (echō), meaning "to have, hold, or keep," combined with elements denoting posture or retention.

== Family ==
Echemus was the son of Aeropus, son of King Cepheus. He was married to Timandra, daughter of Leda and Tyndareus of Sparta. Timandra bore him a son, Ladocus, before deserting Echemus for Phyleus, the king of Dulichium. This lineage made Echemus a part of the Greek mythical family Atreidai, which stood in direct opposition to the Heracleidae, and emphasised the "pre-dorian" ancestry of the Tegeans and Arcadians.

An alternative genealogy makes Echemus a son of Aeropus, son of the war god Ares rather than Cepheus, this was a genealogy presented to Pausanias in Tegea, which he includes in his description of the temple of Ares Aphenius between the cities of Tegea and Pallantium.

== Mythology ==
After the death of Eurystheus, Hyllus led the Heracleidae to attack Mycenae. Echemus offered himself as the champion of the defending Arcadian forces and killed Hyllus in single combat, thus forcing the Heracleidae to withdraw. This story is mentioned by the Tegeans as an example of their people's bravery in book 9 of The Histories by Herodotus; who puts in connection with a debate between the Tegeans and Athenians about who should cover the left part of the Hellenic army at the Battle of Plataea, the last major battle of the Persian Wars. Pausanias further lists this among the most important achievements of the Tegeans. Echemus defeat of Hyllus allegedly stopped the arrival of the Dorians in the Peloponnese, and the events were considered to have taken place when the Peloponnese was unified under rule of Tisamenus.

When visiting Tegea, Pausanias was shown the tomb of Echemus and a relief depicting his victory over Hyllus. A late Classical relief, now in the Archaeological Museum of Tegea, shows an inscription with the name Echemus.

Echemus was the victor in wrestling during the first Olympic games established by Heracles.

== Literature ==
- Hesiod, Catalogue of Women from Homeric Hymns, Epic Cycle, Homerica translated by Evelyn-White, H G. Loeb Classical Library Volume 57. London: William Heinemann, 1914.
- Karapanagiotou, A. (2017) Archaeological Museum of Tegea: Guide, Athens: Hellenic Ministry of Culture and Sports/Ephorate of Antiquities of Arcadia.
- Pausanias, Description of Greece with an English Translation by W.H.S. Jones, Litt.D., and H.A. Ormerod, M.A., in 4 Volumes. Cambridge, MA, Harvard University Press; London, William Heinemann Ltd. 1918. Online version at the Perseus Digital Library
- Pindar, The Odes of Pindar including the Principal Fragments with an Introduction and an English Translation by Sir John Sandys, Litt.D., FBA. Cambridge, MA., Harvard University Press; London, William Heinemann Ltd. 1937. Greek text available at the Perseus Digital Library
- Pretzler, Maria (1999) "Myth and History at Tegea - Local Traditio and Community Identity". In T.H Nielsen and J. Roy eds. Defining Ancient Arkadia, Munksgaard: Copenhagen, 89–120.
