= Temenus =

Son of Aristomachus, in Greek mythology

In Greek mythology, Temenus /ˈtɛmɪnəs/ (Greek: Τήμενος, Tḗmenos) was a son of Aristomachus and brother of Cresphontes and Aristodemus.

Temenus was a great-great-grandson of Heracles and helped lead the fifth and final attack on Mycenae in the Peloponnese. He became King of Argos. He was the father of Ceisus, Káranos, Phalces (who was said to be founder of Sicyon), Agraeus, and Hyrnetho. Káranos was the first king of the ancient Greek kingdom of Macedonia and founder of the royal Macedonian dynasty–the Temenid or Argead dynasty–which culminated in the sons of Alexander the Great five centuries later.

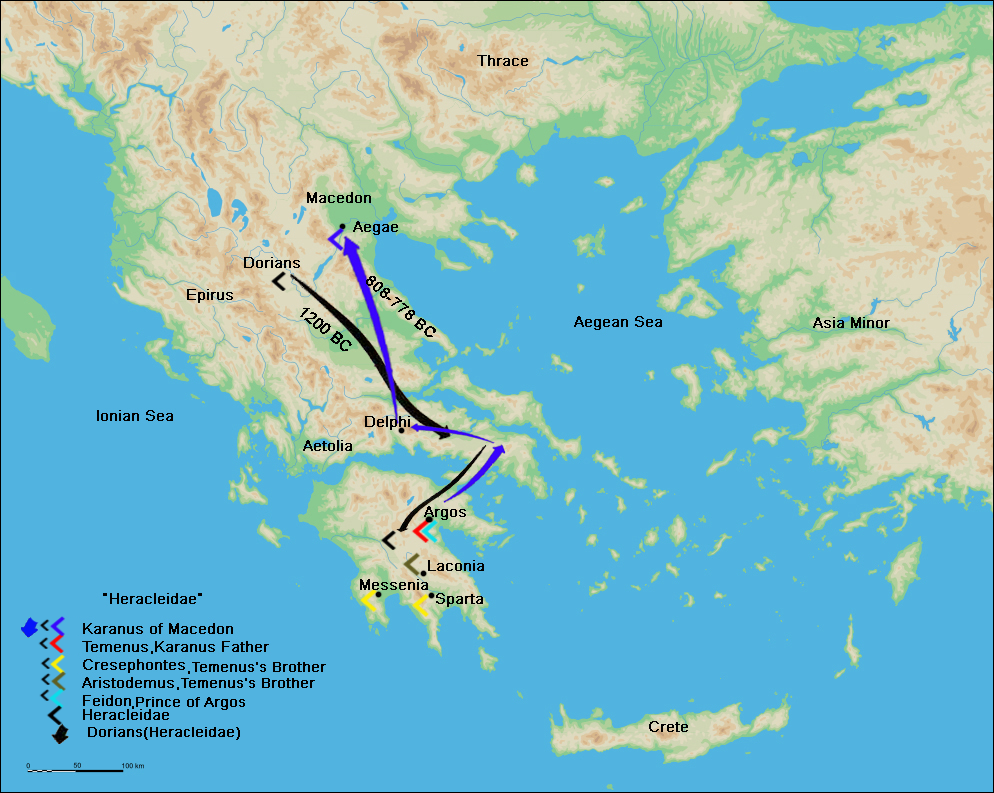
The itinerary of the family of Temenus

== Conquest of the Peloponnese ==
Temenus and his brothers complained to the oracle that its instructions had proved fatal to those who had followed them (the oracle had told Hyllas to attack through the narrow passage when the third fruit was ripe). They received the answer that by the "third fruit" the "third generation" was meant, and that the "narrow passage" was not the isthmus of Corinth, but the straits of Patras.

They accordingly built a fleet at Naupactus, but before they set sail, Aristodemus was struck by lightning (or shot by Apollo) and the fleet destroyed, because one of the Heracleidae had slain an Acarnanian soothsayer. The oracle, being again consulted by Temenus, bade him offer an expiatory sacrifice and banish the murderer for ten years, and look out for a man with three eyes to act as guide.

On his way back to Naupactus, Temenus fell in with Oxylus, an Aetolian, who had lost one eye, riding on a horse (or mule) (thus making up the three eyes) and immediately pressed him into his service. The Heracleidae repaired their ships, sailed from Naupactus to Antirrhium, and thence to Rhium in Peloponnesus.

A decisive battle was fought with Tisamenus, son of Orestes, the chief ruler in the peninsula, who was defeated and slain. The Heracleidae, who thus became practically masters of the Peloponnese, proceeded to distribute its territory among themselves by lot. Argos fell to Temenus, Lacedaemon to Procles and Eurysthenes, the twin sons of Aristodemus; and Messene to Cresphontes. The fertile district of Elis had been reserved by agreement for Oxylus. The Heracleidae ruled in Lacedaemon until 221 BC, but disappeared much earlier in the other countries.

This conquest of Peloponnesus by the Dorians, commonly called the "Return of the Heracleidae", is represented as the recovery by the descendants of Heracles of the rightful inheritance of their hero ancestor and his sons. The Dorians followed the custom of other Greek tribes in claiming as ancestor for their ruling families one of the legendary heroes, but the traditions must not on that account be regarded as entirely mythical. They represent a joint invasion of Peloponnesus by Aetolians and Dorians, the latter having been driven southward from their original northern home under pressure from the Thessalians.

It is noticeable that there is no dominant mention of these Heracleidae or their invasion in Homer or Hesiod. Herodotus (vi. 52) speaks of poets who had celebrated their deeds, but these were limited to events immediately succeeding the death of Heracles. The story was first amplified by the Greek tragedians, who probably drew their inspiration from local legends, which glorified the services rendered by Athens to the rulers of the Peloponnese.

== Reign ==
When Temenus, upon the division of the Peloponnese, had obtained Argos as his share, he bestowed all his affections upon his daughter Hyrnetho and her husband Deiphontes, for which he was murdered by his sons, who thought themselves neglected. According to Apollodorus, after the death of Temenus the army declared Deiphontes and Hyrnetho his rightful successors. Pausanias, however, reports a different story. According to him, after Temenus's death it was not Deiphontes that succeeded him, but Ceisus. Deiphontes on the other hand is said to have lived at Epidaurus, whither he went with the army which was attached to him, and whence he expelled the Ionian king, Pityreus. His brothers-in-law, however, who begrudged him the possession of their sister Hyrnetho, went to Epidaurus and tried to persuade her to leave her husband; and when this attempt failed, they carried her off by force. Deiphontes pursued them, and after having killed one of them, Cerynes, he wrestled with the other, who held his sister in his arms. In this struggle, Hyrnetho was killed by her own brother, who then escaped. Deiphontes carried her body back to Epidaurus, and there erected a sanctuary to her.

According to the playwright Euripides, Temenus had a son named Archelaus. This was likely a fabrication to help solidify the connection to the Argive Heritage. The first historically accurate mention is the much later king, Archelaus (413–399).

== Sources ==
- Bibliotheca ii. 8.
- Diodorus Siculus, iv. 57, 58.
- Pausanias, i. 32, 41, ii. 13, 18, iii. I, iv. 3, v. 3.
- Euripides, Heracleidae.
- Pindar, Pythians, ix. 137.
- Herodotus, ix. 27.
- Karl Otfried Müller. Dorians, Part I, Chapter 3.
- Thirlwall. History of Greece, Chapter VII.
- Grote. History of Greece, Part I, Chapter XVIII.
- Georg Busolt. Griechische Geschichte, Part I, Chapter 11, Section 7, where a list of authorities is given.

Regnal titles
Preceded by Cylarabes	King of Argos	Succeeded by Deiphontes
