= Heraclidae =

Descendants of Greek hero Heracles

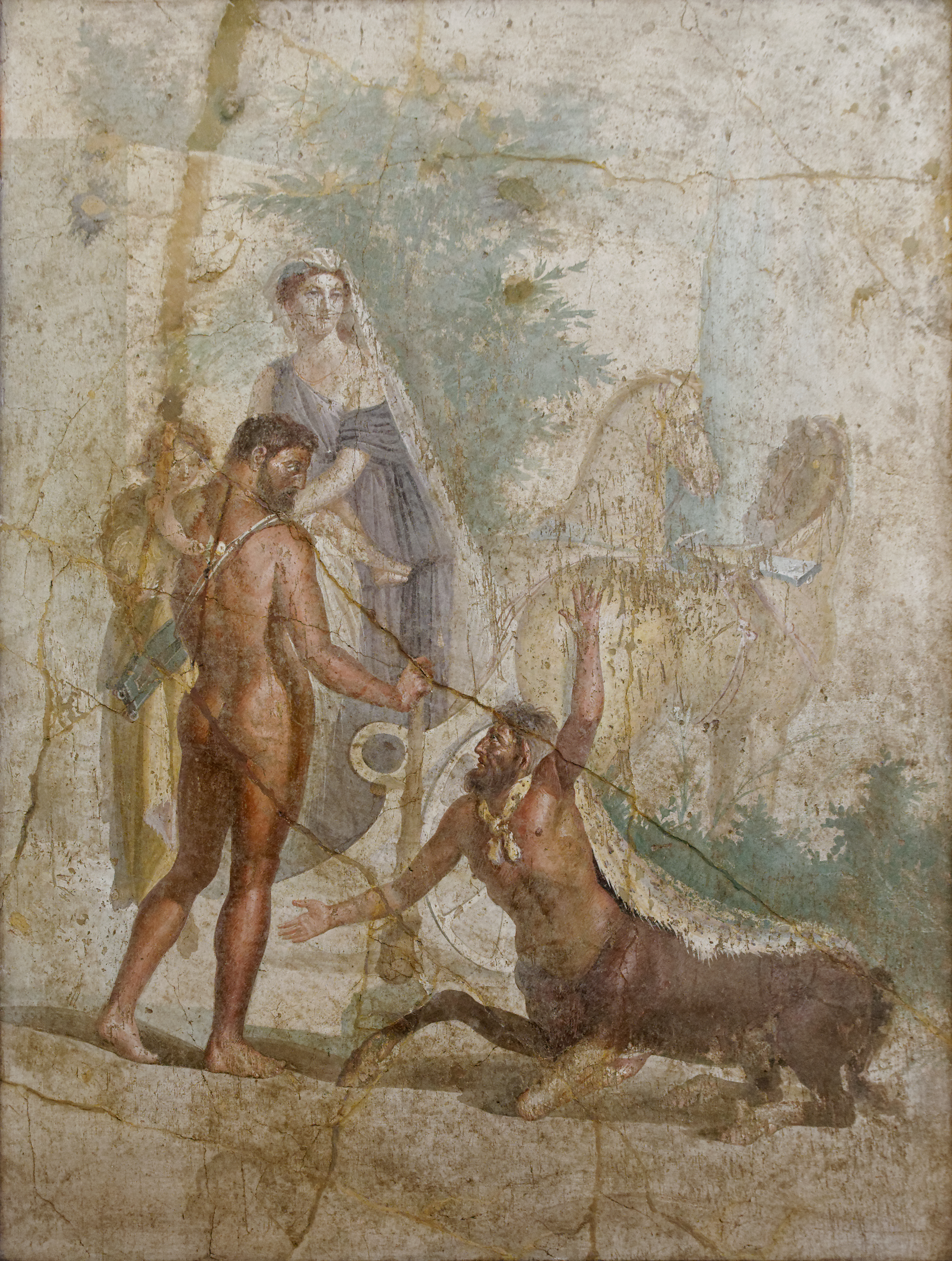
Heracles holding Hyllus with Deianira nearby, as the centaur Nessus pleads for his life (Pompeii fresco)

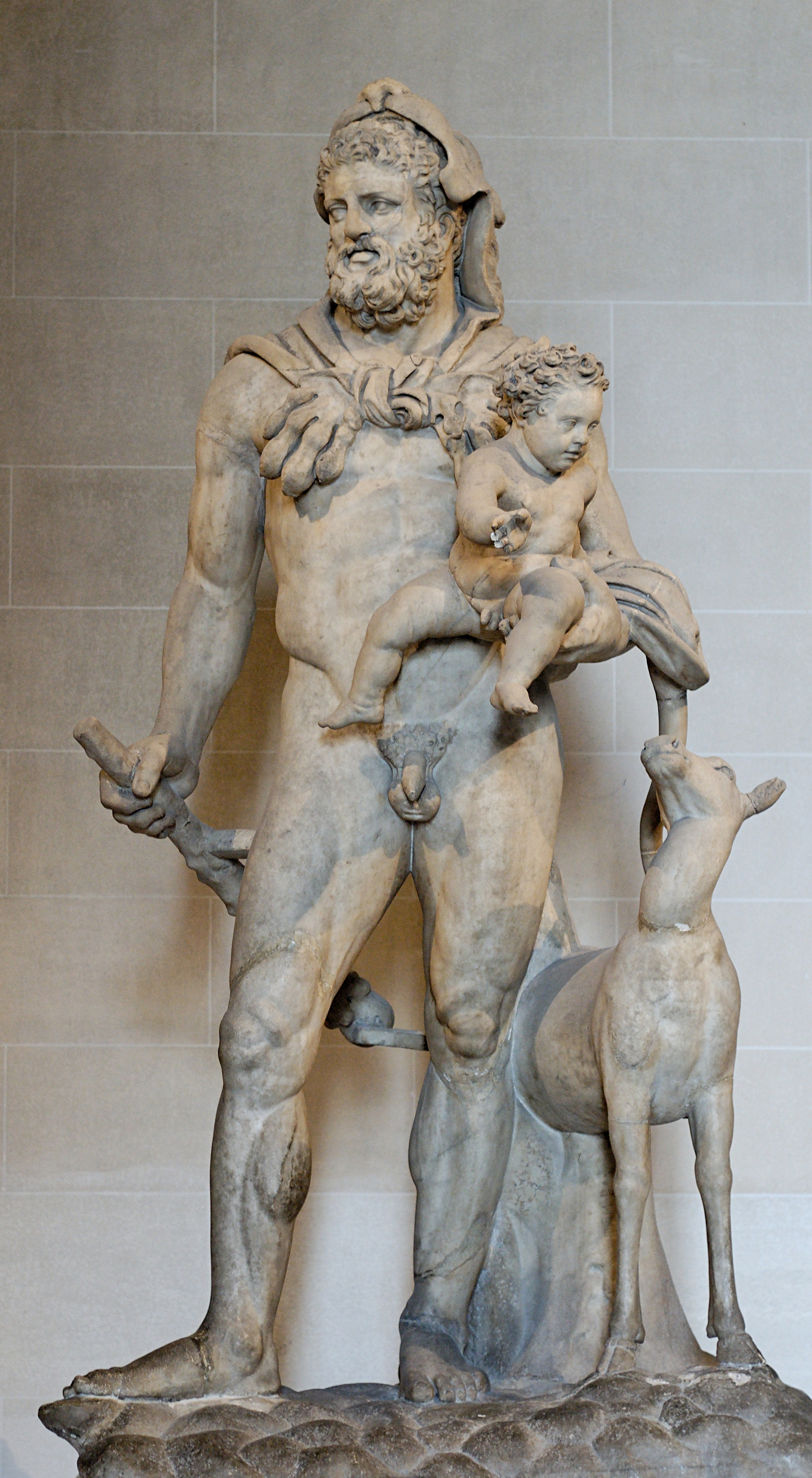
Heracles with his son Telephus, one of the Heraclidae

The Heraclidae (Note: Also spelled Heracleidae or Herakleidai.) (/hɛrəˈklaɪdiː/; Ancient Greek: Ἡρακλεῖδαι, romanized: Hērakleîdai; Latin: Hēraclīdae) or Heraclids (/ˈhɛrəklɪdz/) were the numerous descendants of Heracles, especially applied in a narrower sense to the descendants of Hyllus, the eldest of his four sons by Deianira (Hyllus was also sometimes thought of as Heracles' son by Melite). Other Heraclidae included Macaria, Lamos, Manto, Bianor, Tlepolemus, and Telephus. These Heraclids were a group of Dorian kings who conquered the Peloponnesian kingdoms of Mycenae, Sparta and Argos; according to the literary tradition in Greek mythology, they claimed a right to rule through their ancestor. Since Karl Otfried Müller's Die Dorier (1830, English translation 1839), I. ch. 3, their rise to dominance has been associated with a "Dorian invasion". Though details of genealogy differ from one ancient author to another, the cultural significance of the mythic theme, that the descendants of Heracles, exiled after his death, returned some generations later to reclaim land that their ancestors had held in Mycenaean Greece, was to assert the primal legitimacy of a traditional ruling clan that traced its origin, thus its legitimacy, to Heracles.

In the historical period, several dynasties claimed descent from Heracles, such as the Agiads and Eurypontids of Sparta, or the Temenids of Macedonia. In modern times, the same lineage has been claimed by the House of Burgundy and the kings of Castile.

== Origin ==
Heracles, whom Zeus had originally intended to be ruler of Argos, Lacedaemon and Messenian Pylos, had been supplanted by the cunning of Hera, and his intended possessions had fallen into the hands of Eurystheus, king of Mycenae. After the death of Heracles, his children, after many wanderings, found refuge from Eurystheus at Athens. Eurystheus, on his demand for their surrender being refused, attacked Athens, but was defeated and slain. Hyllus and his brothers then invaded Peloponnesus, but after a year's stay were forced by a pestilence to quit. They withdrew to Thessaly, where Aegimius, the mythical ancestor of the Dorians, whom Heracles had assisted in war against the Lapithae, adopted Hyllus and made over to him a third part of his territory.

After the death of Aegimius, his two sons, Pamphylus and Dymas, voluntarily submitted to Hyllus (who was, according to the Dorian tradition in Herodotus V. 72, really an Achaean), who thus became ruler of the Dorians, the three branches of that race being named after these three heroes. Desiring to reconquer his paternal inheritance, Hyllus consulted the Delphic oracle, which told him to wait for "the third fruit", (or "the third crop") and then enter Peloponnesus by "a narrow passage by sea". Accordingly, after three years, Hyllus marched across the isthmus of Corinth to attack Atreus, the successor of Eurystheus, but was slain in single combat by Echemus, king of Tegea. This second attempt was followed by a third under Cleodaeus and a fourth under Aristomachus, both unsuccessful.

== Return to the Peloponnese ==
At last, Temenus, Cresphontes and Aristodemus, the sons of Aristomachus, complained to the oracle that its instructions had proved fatal to those who had followed them. They received the answer that by the "third fruit" the "third generation" was meant, and that the "narrow passage" was not the isthmus of Corinth, but the straits of Rhium. They accordingly built a fleet at Naupactus, but before they set sail, Aristodemus was struck by lightning (or shot by Apollo) and the fleet destroyed, because one of the Heraclidae had slain an Acarnanian soothsayer.

The oracle, being again consulted by Temenus, bade him offer an expiatory sacrifice and banish the murderer for ten years, and look out for a man with three eyes to act as guide. On his way back to Naupactus, Temenus fell in with Oxylus, an Aetolian, who had lost one eye, riding on a horse (thus making up the three eyes) and immediately pressed him into his service. According to another account, a mule on which Oxylus rode had lost an eye. The Heraclidae repaired their ships, sailed from Naupactus to Antirrhium, and thence to Rhium in Peloponnesus. A decisive battle was fought with Tisamenus, son of Orestes, the chief ruler in the peninsula, who was defeated and slain. This conquest was traditionally dated eighty years after the Trojan War.

The Heraclidae, who thus became practically masters of Peloponnesus, proceeded to distribute its territory among themselves by lot. Argos fell to Temenus, Lacedaemon to Procles and Eurysthenes, the twin sons of Aristodemus; and Messenia to Cresphontes (tradition maintains that Cresphontes cheated in order to obtain Messenia, which had the best land of all.) The fertile district of Elis had been reserved by agreement for Oxylus. The Heraclidae ruled in Lacedaemon until 221 BCE, but disappeared much earlier in the other countries.

This conquest of Peloponnesus by the Dorians, commonly called the "Dorian invasion" or the "Return of the Herakleidai", is represented as the recovery by the descendants of Heracles of the rightful inheritance of their hero ancestor and his sons. The Dorians followed the custom of other Greek tribes in claiming as ancestor for their ruling families one of the legendary heroes, but the traditions must not on that account be regarded as entirely mythical. They represent a joint invasion of Peloponnesus by Aetolians and Dorians, the latter having been driven southward from their original northern home under pressure from the Thessalians. It is noticeable that there is no mention of these Heraclidae or their invasion in Homer or Hesiod. Herodotus (vi. 52) speaks of poets who had celebrated their deeds, but these were limited to events immediately succeeding the death of Heracles.

== List of Heraclidae ==
=== At Lydia ===
A Heraclid royal family ruled Lydia as well, but sources differ as to their maternal parentage and lineage. The Heraclids are widely agreed to have been descended from Heracles and a woman of Iardanus, but sources differ on whether this woman was his girl or his illustrious daughter, Queen Omphale.

Herodotus writes that Heracles sired this dynasty with a slave-girl of Iardanus (who, since she was unnamed in Herodotus' account, might be Omphale). In this account, the first of this line to rule was their great-great-grandson, named Agron. After Agron, Lydia would be ruled by Heraclid kings over 22 generations for 505 years. This line of kings would include Meles, followed by his son Candaules. Candaules was infamous for his voyeuristic appetites (see candaulism and the Ring of Gyges). He would be overthrown and usurped by his servant Gyges, who would go on to found the Mermnad dynasty.

However, most other sources say the Heraclids of Lydia were not descended from Iardanus' anonymous slave-girl, but from his daughter Omphale - a Lydian queen who held Heracles in servitude for a year. Their romance was characterised by an inversion of gender norms, with Omphale taking the masculine role and Heracles taking the feminine role in both social and sexual contexts. Pseudo-Apollodorus writes that the Lydian Heraclids were descended Omphale and Heracles' son Agelaus, who would go on to be an ancestor of Crœsus. Dionysus of Halicarnassus also writes that Heracles and Omphale sired royal children, such as Tyrrhenus, founder of the Etruscans. This might be supported by Pausanias, who writes that Heracles had a Lydian son named Tyrsenus, which is used in other texts as a variation of Tyrrhenus. According to Xanthus of Lydia, the Heraclid dynasty of Lydia traced their descent to a son of Heracles and Omphale named Tylon, and were called Tylonidai. "Tylon" is a variation of Tylos, a native Anatolian deity interpreted as Heracles.

=== At Sparta ===
At Sparta, the Heraclids formed two dynasties ruling jointly: the Agiads and the Eurypontids. Other Spartiates also claimed Heraclid descent, such as Lysander.

=== At Corinth ===
At Corinth the Heraclids ruled as the Bacchiadae dynasty before the aristocratic revolution, which brought a Bacchiad aristocracy into power.

=== At Argos ===
Genealogy of the Argead Dynasty

A descendant of Heracles, Temenus, was the first king of Argos, who later counted the famous tyrant Pheidon.

=== In Macedonia ===
After becoming the kings of Argos, the Heraclid line of Temenus would later go on to rule Macedonia. This was the Argead Dynasty of Macedonia (so-named because of its origins in Argos). It was established in Macedonia a Temenid descendant of Heracles, who left Argos and settled in Macedonia, establishing his own kingdom. However, sources differ as to which Temenid founded the Macedonian branch of the family. Herodotus and Thucydides write that the dynasty was founded by Perdiccas, who conquered the Macedonian plain and founded a fort, around which grew the kingdom.. However, later sources (including Marsyas of Pella, as well as Roman sources such as Livy) say the Argead dynasty was established in Macedonia by Caranus. According to Marsyas of Pella, Caranus did not just simply conquer Macedonia; he first received a prophecy from the Oracle at Delphi advising him to do so, and therefore had a divine justification for his expedition.

The Kingdom of Macedonia under the Argead dynasty would be famous for its global conquests under Alexander the Great, beginning the Hellenistic period. Under the reign of Philip II - Alexander's father and predecessor - the Argead Dynasty had extended its hegemony over all of Upper Macedonia, and had become the most powerful kingdom in the Aegean apart from Achaemenid Persia. Alexander the Great would continue Philip's conquests in Greece, and then conquer the Persian Empire, and expand as far as Egypt and India.

=== In Thessaly ===
The Aleuad dynasty, which dominated Thessalian politics from the sixth century BCE until the Hellenistic period, claimed descent variously from Thessalus and Haemon, both believed to be sons of Heracles.

=== In modern times ===
In modern times, Heraclid lineage has been claimed by the House of Burgundy and the kings of Castile. The seventeenth-century Spanish king Philip IV, a descendant of both houses, commissioned the artist Francisco de Zurbarán to paint a series of ten works depicting Hercules, as part of the decoration of his Buen Retiro Palace; these artworks were considered an allegory for the legitimacy of his rule.

== In Euripides' tragedy ==
The Greek tragedians amplified the story, probably drawing inspiration from local legends which glorified the services rendered by Athens to the rulers of Peloponnesus.

The Heraclidae feature as the main subjects of Euripides' play, Heraclidae. J. A. Spranger found the political subtext of Heraclidae, never far to seek, so particularly apt in Athens towards the end of the peace of Nicias, in 419 BCE, that he suggested the date as that of the play's first performance.

In the tragedy, Iolaus, Heracles' old comrade and nephew, and Heracles' children, Macaria and her brothers and sisters have hidden from Eurystheus in Athens, ruled by King Demophon; as the first scene makes clear, they expect that the blood relationship of the kings with Heracles and their father's past indebtedness to Theseus will finally provide them sanctuary. As Eurystheus prepares to attack, an oracle tells Demophon that only the sacrifice of a noble woman to Persephone can guarantee an Athenian victory. Macaria volunteers for the sacrifice and a spring is named the Macarian spring in her honor.

== Sources ==
- Bibliotheca ii. 8
- Diodorus Siculus iv. 57, 58
- Pausanias i. 32, 41, ii. 13, 18, iii. I, iv. 3, v. 3
- Euripides, Children of Heracles
- Pindar, Pythia, ix. 137
- Herodotus ix. 27
- Connop Thirlwall, History of Greece, ch. vii
- George Grote, History of Greece, pt. i. ch. xviii
- Georg Busolt, Griechische Geschichte, i. ch. ii. sec. 7, where a list of modern authorities is given
