= Dorians =

Ancient Greek tribe

The Dorians (/ˈdɔːriənz/; Greek: Δωριεῖς, Dōrieîs, singular Δωριεύς, Dōrieús) were one of the four major ethnic groups into which the Hellenes (or Greeks) of Classical Greece divided themselves (along with the Aeolians, Achaeans, and Ionians). They are almost always referred to as just "the Dorians", as they are called in the earliest literary mention of them in the Odyssey, where they already can be found inhabiting the island of Crete.

They were diverse in way of life and social organization, varying from the populous trade center of the city of Corinth, known for its ornate style in art and architecture, to the isolationist, military state of Sparta; and yet, all Hellenes knew which localities were Dorian and which were not. Dorian states at war could more likely, but not always, count on the assistance of other Dorian states. Dorians were distinguished by the Doric Greek dialect and by characteristic social and historical traditions.

In the 5th century BC, Dorians and Ionians were the two most politically important Greek ethnē, whose ultimate clash resulted in the Peloponnesian War. The degree to which fifth-century Hellenes self-identified as "Ionian" or "Dorian" has itself been disputed. At one extreme Édouard Will concludes that there was no true ethnic component in fifth-century Greek culture, in spite of anti-Dorian elements in Athenian propaganda. At the other extreme John Alty reinterprets the sources to conclude that ethnicity did motivate fifth-century actions. Moderns viewing these ethnic identifications through the 5th and 4th century BC literary tradition have been profoundly influenced by their own social politics. Also, according to E. N. Tigerstedt, nineteenth-century European admirers of virtues they considered "Dorian" identified themselves as "Laconophile" and found responsive parallels in the culture of their day as well; their biases contribute to the traditional modern interpretation of "Dorians".

== Origin ==
Accounts vary as to the Dorians' place of origin. One theory, widely believed in ancient times, is that they originated in the mountainous regions of Greece, such as Macedonia and Epirus, and obscure circumstances brought them south into the Peloponnese, to certain Aegean islands.

=== Peloponnesian dialect replacement ===
The origin of the Dorians is a multifaceted concept. In modern scholarship, the term has often meant the location of the population disseminating the Doric Greek dialect within a hypothetical Proto-Greek speaking population. The dialect is known from records of classical northwestern Greece, the Peloponnesus and Crete and some of the islands. The geographic and ethnic information found in the West's earliest known literary work, the Iliad, combined with the administrative records of the former Mycenaean states, prove to universal satisfaction that East Greek (Ionian) speakers were once dominant in the Peloponnesus but suffered a setback there and were replaced at least in official circles by West Greek (Doric) speakers. A historical event is associated with the overthrow, called anciently the Return of the Herakleidai (also spelt Heraclidae) and by moderns the Dorian Invasion.

This theory of a return or invasion presupposes that West Greek speakers resided in northwest Greece but overran the Peloponnesus replacing the East Greek there with their own dialect. No records other than Mycenaean ones are known to have existed in the Bronze Age so a West Greek of that time and place can be neither proved nor disproved. West Greek speakers were in western Greece in classical times. Unlike the East Greeks, they are not associated with any evidence of displacement events. That provides circumstantial evidence that the Doric dialect disseminated among the Hellenes of northwest Greece, a highly-mountainous and somewhat-isolated region.

=== Dorian invasion ===
The Dorian invasion is a modern historical concept attempting to account for:

- at least the replacement of dialects and traditions in southern Greece in pre-classical times
- more generally, the distribution of the Dorians in Classical Greece
- the presence of the Dorians in Greece at all

On the whole, none of the objectives has been met, but the investigations served to rule out various speculative hypotheses. Most scholars doubt that the Dorian invasion was the main cause of the collapse of the Mycenaean civilization. The source of the West Greek speakers in the Peloponnese remains unattested by any solid evidence.

=== Post-migrational distribution of the Dorians ===
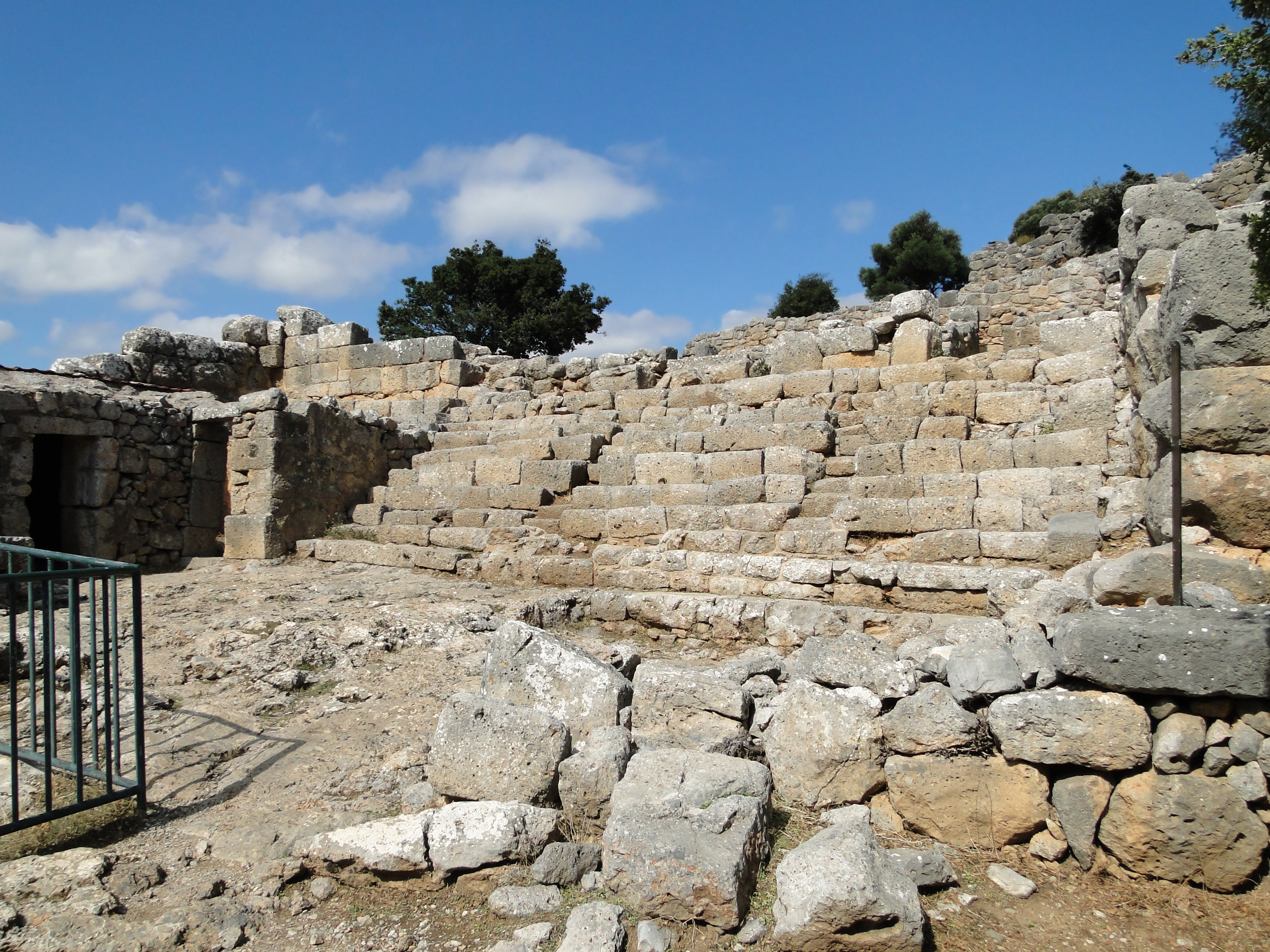
Dorian site of Lato on the island of Crete

Though most of the Dorians settled in the Peloponnese, they also settled on Rhodes and Sicily and in what is now Southern Italy. In Asia Minor existed the Dorian Hexapolis (the six great Dorian cities): Halikarnassos (Halicarnassus) and Knidos (Cnidus) in Asia Minor, Kos, and Lindos, Kameiros, and Ialyssos on the island of Rhodes. The six cities would later become rivals with the Ionian cities of Asia Minor. The Dorians also settled Crete. The origin traditions remained strong into classical times: Thucydides saw the Peloponnesian War in part as "Ionians fighting against Dorians" and reported the tradition that the Syracusans in Sicily were of Dorian descent. Other such "Dorian" colonies, originally from Corinth, Megara, and the Dorian islands, dotted the southern coasts of Sicily from Syracuse to Selinus. Also Taras was a Spartan colony.

== Identity ==
=== Ethnonym ===
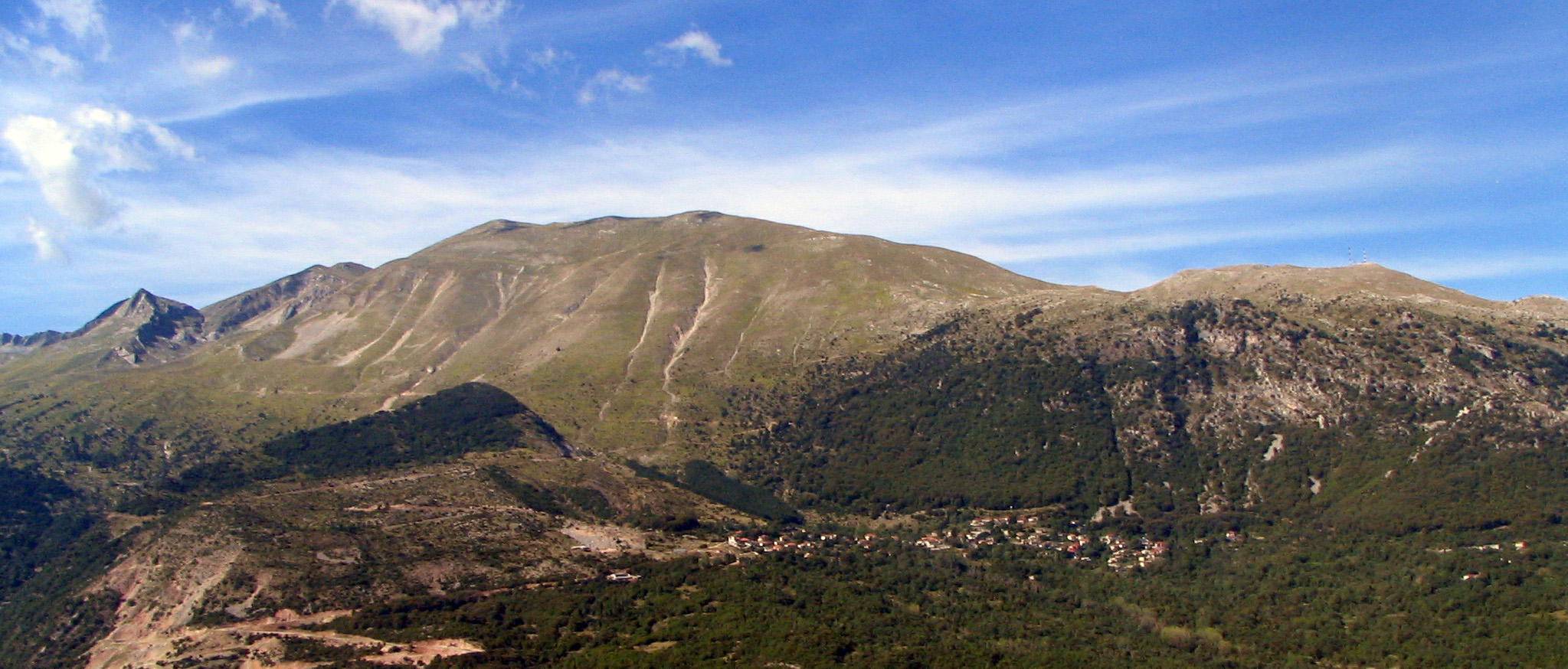
Uplands of Greece - the Pindus Mountains

==== Dorian of Bronze Age Pylos ====
A man's name, Dōrieus, occurs in the Linear B tablets at Pylos, one of the regions later invaded and subjugated by the Dorians. Pylos tablet Fn867 records it in the dative case as do-ri-je-we, *Dōriēwei, a third- or consonant-declension noun with stem ending in w. An unattested nominative plural, *Dōriēwes, would have become Dōrieis by loss of the w and contraction. The tablet records the grain rations issued to the servants of "religious dignitaries" celebrating a religious festival of Potnia, the mother goddess.

The nominative singular, Dōrieus, remained the same in the classical period. Many Linear B names of servants were formed from their home territory or the places where they came into Mycenaean ownership. Carl Darling Buck sees the -eus suffix as very productive. One of its uses was to convert a toponym to an anthroponym; for example, Megareus, "Megarian", from Megara. A Dōrieus would be from Dōris, the only classical Greek state to serve as the basis for the name of the Dorians. The state was a small one in the mountains of west central Greece. However, classical Doris may not have been the same as Mycenaean Doris.

==== Dorians of upland Doris ====
A number of credible etymologies by noted scholars have been proposed. Julius Pokorny derives Δωριεύς, Dōrieus from δωρίς, dōris, "woodland" (which can also mean upland). The dōri- segment is from the o-grade (either ō or o) of Proto-Indo-European *deru-, "tree", which also gives the Homeric Δούρειος Ἵππος (Doureios Hippos, "Wooden Horse"). This derivation has the advantage of naming the people after their wooded, mountainous country.

==== Lancers ====
A second popular derivation was given by the French linguist, Émile Boisacq, from the same root, but from Greek δόρυ (doru) 'spear-shaft' (which was made of wood); i.e., "the people of the spear" or "spearmen". In this case the country would be named after the people, as in Saxony from the Saxons. However, R. S. P. Beekes doubted the validity of this derivation and asserted that no good etymology exists.

==== Chosen Greeks ====
It sometimes happens that different derivations of an Indo-European word exploit similar-sounding Indo-European roots. Greek doru, "lance", is from the o-grade of Indo-European *deru, "solid", in the sense of wood. It is similar to an extended form, *dō-ro-, of *dō-, (give), as can be seen in the modern Greek imperative δώσε (dose, "give [sing.]!") appearing in Greek as δῶρον (dōron, "gift"). This is the path taken by Jonathan Hall, relying on elements taken from the myth of the Return of the Herakleidai.

Hall cites the tradition, based on a fragment of the poet, Tyrtaeus, that "Sparta is a divine gift granted by Zeus and Hera" to the Heraclidae. In another version, Tyndareus gives his kingdom to Heracles in gratitude for restoring him to the throne, but Heracles "asks the Spartan king to safeguard the gift until his descendants might claim it."

Hall, therefore, proposes that the Dorians are the people of the gift. They assumed the name on taking possession of Lacedaemon. Doris was subsequently named after them. Hall makes comparisons of Spartans to Hebrews as a chosen people maintaining a covenant with God and being assigned a Holy Land. To arrive at this conclusion, Hall relies on Herodotus' version of the myth (see below) that the Hellenes under Dorus did not take his name until reaching the Peloponnesus. In other versions the Heraclidae enlisted the help of their Dorian neighbors. Hall does not address the problem of the Dorians not calling Lacedaemon Doris, but assigning that name to some less holy and remoter land. Similarly, he does not mention the Dorian servant at Pylos, whose sacred gift, if such it was, was still being ruled by the Achaean Atreid family at Lacedaemon.

A minor, and perhaps regrettably forgotten, episode in the history of scholarship was the attempt to emphasize the etymology of Doron with the meaning of 'hand'. This in turn was connected to an interpretation of the famous lambda on Spartan shields, which was to rather stand for a hand with outstanding thumb than the initial letter of Lacedaimon. Given the origin of the Spartan shield lambda legend, however, in a fragment by Eupolis, an Athenian comic poet, there has been a recent attempt to suggest that a comic confusion between the letter and the hand image may yet have been intended.

=== Social structure ===
Dorian social structure was characterized by a communal social structure and separation of the sexes. The lives of free men centered around military campaigns. When not abroad, men stayed in all-male residences focusing on military training until the age of 30, regardless of marital status.

Dorian women had greater freedom and economic power than women of other Greek ethnicities. Unlike other Hellenic women, Dorian women were able to own property, manage their husbands' estate, and delegate many domestic tasks to slaves. Women in ancient Sparta possessed the greatest agency and economic power, likely due to the prolonged absences of men during military campaigns. Dorian women wore the peplos, which was once common to all Hellenes. This tunic was pinned at the shoulders by brooches and had slit skirts which bared the thighs and permitted more freedom of movement than the voluminous Ionian chiton (costume).

=== Distinctions of language ===
The Doric dialect was spoken in northwest Greece, the Peloponnese, Crete, southwest Asia Minor, the southernmost islands of the Aegean Sea, and the various Dorian colonies of Magna Graecia in Southern Italy and Sicily. After the classical period, it was mainly replaced by the Attic dialect upon which the Koine or "common" Greek language of the Hellenistic period was based. The main characteristic of Doric was the preservation of Proto-Indo-European [aː], long ⟨α⟩, which in Attic-Ionic became [ɛː], ⟨η⟩. A famous example is the valedictory phrase uttered by Spartan mothers to their sons before sending them off to war: ἢ τὰν ἢ ἐπὶ τᾶς (ḕ tàn ḕ epì tâs, literally "either with it or on it": return alive with your shield or dead upon it) would have been ἢ τὴν ἢ ἐπὶ τῆς (ḕ tḕn ḕ epì tês) in the Attic-Ionic dialect of an Athenian mother. Tsakonian, a descendant of Doric Greek, is still spoken in some parts of the southern Argolid coast of the Peloponnese, in the modern prefecture of Arcadia.

=== Other cultural distinctions ===
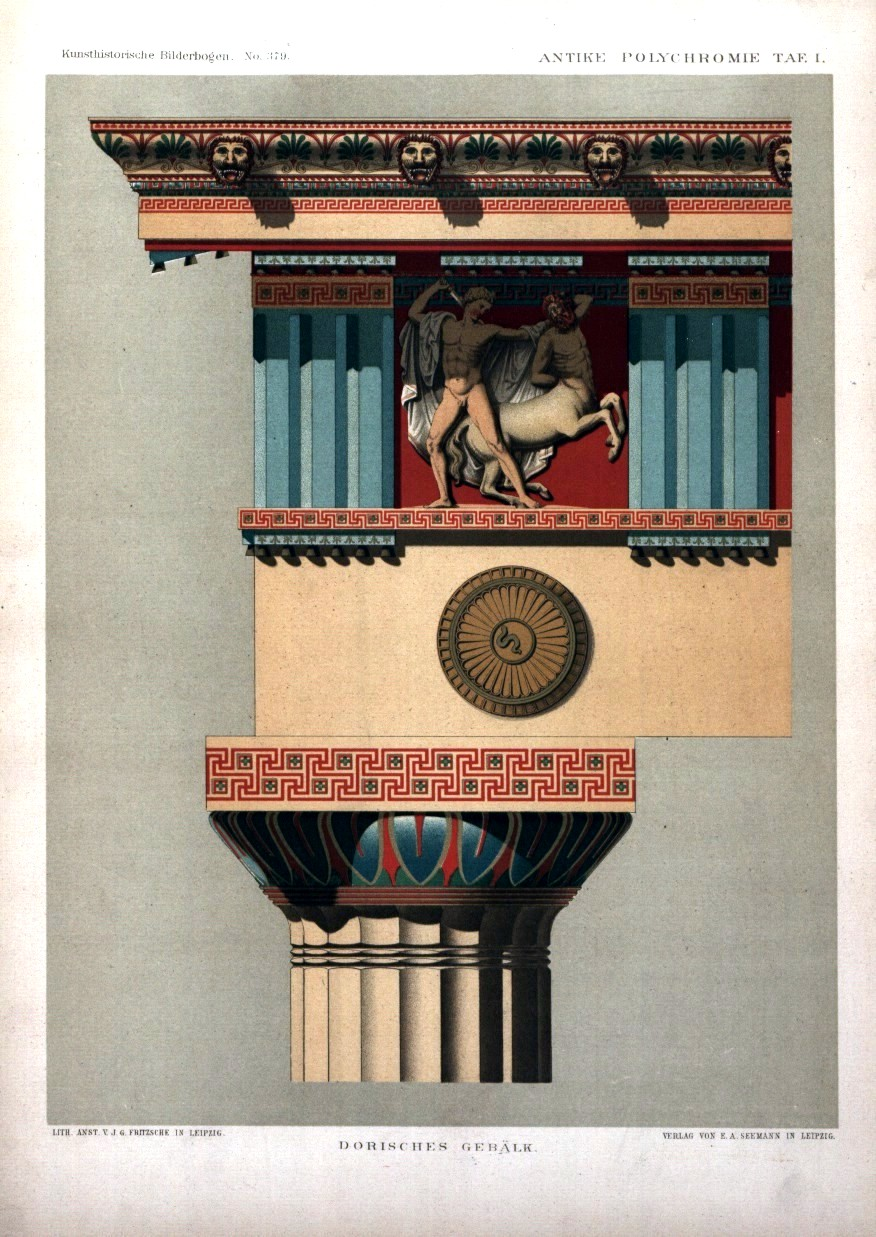
Doric order of architecture with polychromy

Culturally, in addition to their Doric dialect of Greek, Doric colonies retained their characteristic Doric calendar that revolved round a cycle of festivals, the Hyacinthia and the Carneia being especially important.

The Dorian mode in music also was attributed to Doric societies and was associated by classical writers with martial qualities.

The Doric order of architecture in the tradition inherited by Vitruvius included the Doric column, noted for its simplicity and strength.

The Dorians seem to have offered the central mainland cultus for Helios. The scattering of cults of the sun god in Sicyon, Argos, Ermioni, Epidaurus and Laconia, and his holy livestock flocks at Taenarum, seem to suggest that the deity was considerably important in Dorian religion, compared to other parts of ancient Greece. Additionally, it may have been the Dorians to import his worship to Rhodes.

== Ancient traditions ==
In Greek historiography, the Dorians are mentioned by many authors. The chief classical authors to relate their origins are Herodotus, Thucydides and Pausanias. The most copious authors, however, lived in Hellenistic and Roman times, long after the main events. This apparent paradox does not necessarily discredit the later writers, who were relying on earlier works that did not survive. The customs of the Spartan state and its illustrious individuals are detailed at great length in such authors as Plutarch and Diodorus Siculus.

=== Homer ===
The Odyssey has one reference to the Dorians:

There is a land called Crete, in the midst of the wine-dark sea, a fair, rich land, begirt with water, and therein are many men, past counting, and ninety cities. They have not all the same speech, but their tongues are mixed. There dwell Achaeans, there great-hearted native Cretans, there Cydonians, and Dorians of waving plumes, and goodly Pelasgians.

The reference is not compatible with a Dorian invasion that brought Dorians to Crete only after the fall of the Mycenaean states. In the Odyssey, Odysseus and his relatives visit those states. Two solutions are possible, either the Odyssey is anachronistic or Dorians were on Crete in Mycenaean times. The uncertain nature of the Dorian invasion defers a definitive answer until more is known about it. Also, the Messenian town of Dorium is mentioned in the Catalogue of Ships. If its name comes from Dorians, it would imply there were settlements of the latter in Messenia during that time as well.

=== Tyrtaeus ===
Tyrtaeus, a Spartan poet, became advisor of the Lacedaemonians in their mid-7th-century war to suppress a rebellion of the Messenians. The latter were a remnant of the Achaeans conquered "two generations before", which suggests a rise to supremacy at the end of the Dark Age rather than during and after the fall of Mycenae. The Messenian population was reduced to serfdom.

Only a few fragments of Tyrtaeus' five books of martial verse survive. His is the earliest mention of the three Dorian tribes: Pamphyli, Hylleis, Dymanes. He also says:

For Cronus' Son Himself, Zeus the husband of fair-crowned Hera, hath given this city to the children of Heracles, with whom we came into the wide isle of Pelops from windy Erineus.

Erineus was a village of Doris. He helped to establish the Spartan constitution, giving the kings and elders, among other powers, the power to dismiss the assembly. He established a rigorous military training program for the young including songs and poems he wrote himself, such as the "Embateria or Songs of the Battle-Charge which are also called Enoplia or Songs-under-Arms". These were chants used to establish the timing of standard drills under arms. He stressed patriotism:

For 'tis a fair thing for a good man to fall and die fighting in the van for his native land, ... let us fight with a will for this land, and die for our children and never spare our lives.

=== Herodotus ===
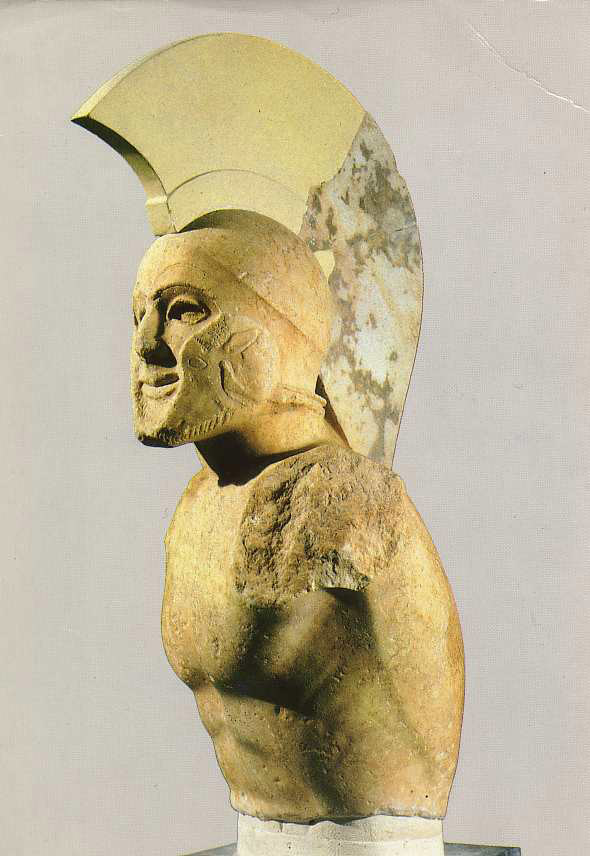
Fifth century BC hoplite, or "heavy-armed soldier", possibly the Spartan king Leonidas, a Dorian, who died holding the pass at the Battle of Thermopylae.

Herodotus was from Halicarnassus, a Dorian colony on the southwest coast of Asia Minor; following the literary tradition of the times he wrote in Ionic Greek, being one of the last authors to do so. He described the Persian Wars, giving a thumbnail account of the histories of the antagonists, Greeks and Persians.

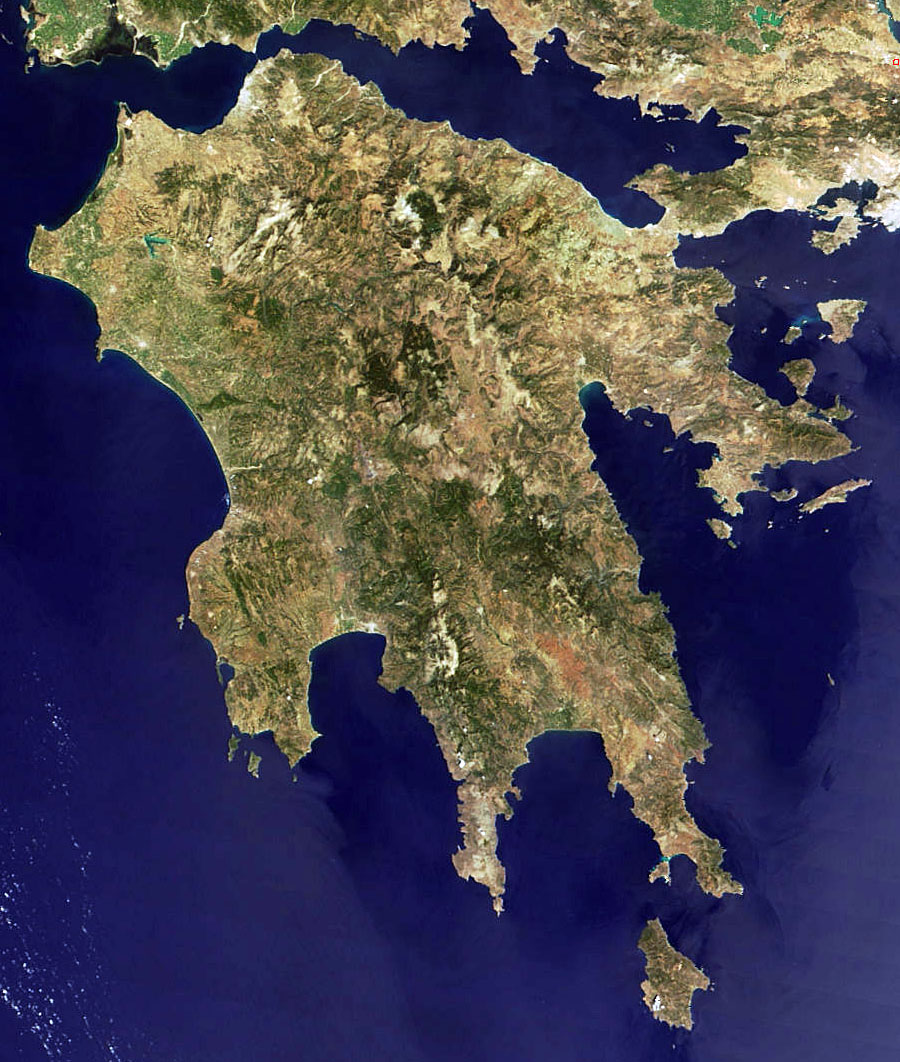
Peloponnesus. Sparta was in the valley of the lowermost bay.

Herodotus gives a general account of the events termed "the Dorian Invasion", presenting them as transfers of population; their original home was in Thessaly and they were related to the ancient Macedonians, before moving south. He goes on to expand in mythological terms, giving some of the geographic details of the myth:

1.56.2-3 And inquiring he found that the Lacedemonians and the Athenians had the pre-eminence, the first of the Dorian and the others of the Ionian race. For these were the most eminent races in ancient time, the second being a Pelasgian and the first a Hellenic race: and the one never migrated from its place in any direction, while the other was very exceedingly given to wanderings; for in the reign of Deucalion this race dwelt in Pthiotis, and in the time of Doros the son of Hellen in the land lying below Ossa and Olympos, which is called Histiaeotis; and when it was driven from Histiaiotis by the sons of Cadmos, it dwelt in Pindos and was called Makednon; and thence it moved afterwards to Dryopis, and from Dryopis it came finally to Peloponnesus, and began to be called Dorian.

1.57.1-3 What language however the Pelasgians used to speak I am not able with certainty to say. But if one must pronounce judging by those that still remain of the Pelasgians who dwelt in the city of Creston above the Tyrsenians, and who were once neighbours of the race now called Dorian, dwelling then in the land which is now called Thessaliotis, and also by those that remain of the Pelasgians who settled at Plakia and Skylake in the region of the Hellespont, who before that had been settlers with the Athenians, and of the natives of the various other towns which are really Pelasgian, though they have lost the name,—if one must pronounce judging by these, the Pelasgians used to speak a Barbarian language. If therefore all the Pelasgian race was such as these, then the Attic race, being Pelasgian, at the same time when it changed and became Hellenic, unlearnt also its language. For the people of Creston do not speak the same language with any of those who dwell about them, nor yet do the people of Phakia, but they speak the same language one as the other: and by this it is proved that they still keep unchanged the form of language which they brought with them when they migrated to these places.

1.58 As for the Hellenic race, it has used ever the same language, as I clearly perceive, since it first took its rise; but since the time when it parted off feeble at first from the Pelasgian race, setting forth from a small beginning it has increased to that great number of races which we see, and chiefly because many Barbarian races have been added to it besides. Moreover it is true, as I think, of the Pelasgian race also, that so far as it remained Barbarian it never made any great increase.

Thus, according to Herodotus, the Dorians did not name themselves after Dorus until they had reached Peloponnesus. Herodotus does not explain the contradictions of the myth; for example, how Doris, located outside the Peloponnesus, acquired its name. However, his goal, as he relates in the beginning of the first book, is only to report what he had heard from his sources without judgement. In the myth, the Achaeans displaced from the Peloponnesus gathered at Athens under a leader Ion and became identified as "Ionians".

Herodotus' list of Dorian states is as follows. From northeastern Greece were Phthia, Histiaea and Macedon. In central Greece were Doris (the former Dryopia) and in the south Peloponnesus, specifically the states of Lacedaemon, Corinth, Sicyon, Epidaurus and Troezen. Hermione was not Dorian but had joined the Dorians. Overseas were the islands of Rhodes, Cos, Nisyrus and the Anatolian cities of Cnidus, Halicarnassus, Phaselis and Calydna. Dorians also colonised Crete including founding of such towns as Lato, Dreros and Olous. The Cynurians were originally Ionians but had become Dorian under the influence of their Argive masters.

=== Thucydides ===
Thucydides professes little of Greece before the Trojan War except to say that it was full of barbarians and that there was no distinction between barbarians and Greeks. The Hellenes came from Phthiotis. The whole country indulged in and suffered from piracy and was not settled. After the Trojan War, "Hellas was still engaged in removing and settling."

Some 60 years after the Trojan War the Boeotians were driven out of Arne by the Thessalians into Boeotia and 20 years later "the Dorians and the Heraclids became masters of the Peloponnese." So the lines were drawn between the Dorians and the Aeolians (here Boeotians) with the Ionians (former Peloponnesians).

Other than these few brief observations Thucydides names but few Dorians. He does make it clear that some Dorian states aligned or were forced to align with the Athenians while some Ionians went with the Lacedaemonians and that the motives for alignment were not always ethnic but were diverse. Among the Dorians was Lacedaemon, Corcyra, Corinth and Epidamnus, Leucadia, Ambracia, Potidaea, Rhodes, Cythera, Argos, Syracuse, Gela, Acragas (later Agrigentum), Acrae, Casmenae.

He does explain with considerable dismay what happened to incite ethnic war after the unity between the Greek states during the Battle of Thermopylae. The Congress of Corinth, formed prior to it, "split into two sections." Athens headed one and Lacedaemon the other:

For a short time the league held together, till the Lacedaemonians and Athenians quarreled, and made war upon each other with their allies, a duel into which all the Hellenes sooner or later were drawn.

He adds: "the real cause I consider to be ... the growth of the power of Athens and the alarm which this inspired in Lacedaemon...."

=== Plato ===
In the Platonic work Laws is mentioned that the Achaeans who fought in the Trojan War, on their return from Troy were driven out from their homes and cities by the young residents, so they migrated under a leader named Dorieus and hence they were renamed "Dorians".

Now during this period of ten years, while the siege lasted, the affairs of each of the besiegers at home suffered much owing to the seditious conduct of the young men. For when the soldiers returned to their own cities and homes, these young people did not receive them fittingly and justly, but in such a way that there ensued a vast number of cases of death, slaughter, and exile. So they, being again driven out, migrated by sea; and because Dorieus was the man who then banded together the exiles, they got the new name of "Dorians", instead of "Achaeans". But as to all the events that follow this, you Lacedaemonians relate them all fully in your traditions.

=== Pausanias ===
The Description of Greece by Pausanias relates that the Achaeans were driven from their lands by Dorians coming from Oeta, a mountainous region bordering on Thessaly. They were led by Hyllus, a son of Heracles, but were defeated by the Achaeans. Under other leadership they managed to be victorious over the Achaeans and remain in the Peloponnesus, a mythic theme called "the return of the Heraclidae." They had built ships at Naupactus in which to cross the Gulf of Corinth. This invasion is viewed by the tradition of Pausanias as a return of the Dorians to the Peloponnesus, apparently meaning a return of families ruling in Aetolia and northern Greece to a land in which they had once had a share. The return is described in detail: there were "disturbances" throughout the Peloponnesus except in Arcadia, and new Dorian settlers. Pausanias goes on to describe the conquest and resettlement of Laconia, Messenia, Argos and elsewhere, and the emigration from there to Crete and the coast of Asia Minor.

=== Diodorus Siculus ===
Diodorus is a rich source of traditional information concerning the mythology and history of the Dorians, especially the Library of History. He does not make any such distinction but the fantastic nature of the earliest material marks it as mythical or legendary. The myths do attempt to justify some Dorian operations, suggesting that they were in part political. (Note: Diodorus Siculus, Library of History volumes I–III. Greek historian of Agyrium in Sicily, c. 80–20 BC, wrote forty books of world history, called Library of History, in three parts: mythical history of peoples, non-Greek and Greek, to the Trojan War; history to Alexander's death (323 BC); history to 54 BC. He was an uncritical compiler, but used good sources and reproduced them faithfully. He is valuable for details unrecorded elsewhere, and as evidence for works now lost, especially writings of Ephorus, Apollodorus, Agatharchides, Philistus, and Timaeus.)

Diodorus quoting from an earlier historian Hecataeus of Abdera details that during the Exodus many Israelites went into the islands of Greece and other places.

All the foreigners were forthwith expelled, and the most valiant and noble among them, under some notable leaders, were brought to Greece and other places, as some relate; the most famous of their leaders were Danaus and Cadmus. But the majority of the people descended into a country not far from Egypt, which is now called Judaea and at that time was altogether uninhabited.

Heracles was a Perseid, a member of the ruling family of Greece. His mother Alcmene had both Perseids and Pelopids in her ancestry. A princess of the realm, she received Zeus thinking he was Amphitryon. Zeus intended his son to rule Greece but according to the rules of succession Eurystheus, born slightly earlier, preempted the right. Attempts to kill Heracles as a child failed. On adulthood he was forced into the service of Eurystheus, who commanded him to perform 12 labors.

Heracles became a warrior without a home, wandering from place to place assisting the local rulers with various problems. He took a retinue of Arcadians with him acquiring also over time a family of grown sons, the Heraclidae. He continued this mode of life even after completing the 12 labors. The legend has it that he became involved with Achaean Sparta when the family of king Tyndareus was unseated and driven into exile by Hippocoön and his family, who in the process happened to kill the son of a friend of Heracles. The latter and his retinue assaulted Sparta, taking it back from Hippocoön. He recalled Tyndareus, set him up as a guardian regent, and instructed him to turn the kingdom over to any descendants of his that should claim it. Heracles went on with the way of life to which he had become accustomed, which was by today's standards that of a mercenary, as he was being paid for his assistance. Subsequently, he founded a colony in Aetolia, then in Trachis.

After displacing the Dryopes, he went to the assistance of the Dorians, who lived in a land called Hestiaeotis under king Aegimius and were campaigning against the numerically superior Lapithae. The Dorians promised him 1/3 of Doris (which they did not yet possess). He asked Aegimius to keep his share of the land "in trust" until it should be claimed by a descendant. He went on to further adventures but was poisoned by his jealous wife, Deianeira. He immolated himself in full armor dressed for combat and "passed from among men into the company of the gods."

=== Strabo ===
Strabo, who depends on the books available to him, goes on to elaborate:

Of these peoples, according to Staphylus, the Dorians occupy the part toward the east, the Cydonians the western part, the Eteo-Cretans the southern; and to these last belongs the town Praisos, where is the temple of the Dictaean Zeus; whereas the other peoples, since they were more powerful, dwelt in the plains. Now it is reasonable to suppose that the Eteo-Cretans and the Cydonians were autochthonous, and that the others were foreigners ...

Beside this sole reference to Dorians in Crete, the mention of the Iliad of the Heraclid Tlepolemus, a warrior on the side of Achaeans and colonist of three important Dorian cities in Rhodes has been also regarded as a later interpolation.

== See also ==
- Dorus
- Dymas
- Greek Dark Ages
- Sea Peoples
- Doris (Asia Minor)

== Bibliography ==
- Drews, Robert (1993). The End of the Bronze Age: Changes in Warfare and the Catastrophe CA. 1200 B.C. Princeton, New Jersey: Princeton University Press. ISBN 0-691-04811-8. Five editions between 1993 and 1995.
- Hall, Jonathan M. (2000). Ethnic Identity in Greek Antiquity. Cambridge University Press. ISBN 0-521-78999-0.
- Hall, Jonathan M. (2006). "Dorians: Ancient Ethnic Group". In Wilson, Nigel (ed.). Encyclopedia of Ancient Greece. New York: Routledge Taylor & Francis Group. pp. 240–242. ISBN 0-415-97334-1.
- Liddell, Henry George; Scott, Robert (1940). Jones, Henry Stuart (ed.). A Greek-English Lexicon (in Ancient Greek and English). Oxford: Clarendon Press.
- Müller, Karl Otfried, Die Dorier (1824) was translated by Henry Tufnel and Sir George Cornewall Lewis and published as The History and Antiquities of the Doric Race, (London: John Murray), 1830, in two vols.
- Pomeroy, Sarah B.; Stanley M. Burstein; Walter Donlan; Jennifer Tolbert Roberts (1999). Ancient Greece: A Political, Social, and Cultural History. Oxford University Press. ISBN 0-19-509742-4.
