= Cleodaeus =

Greek mythological figure

In Greek mythology, Cleodaeus (Ancient Greek: Κλεοδαῖος) was one of the Heraclidae, a grandson of Heracles. He was the son of Heracles's eldest son Hyllus and Iole of Oechalia. He became the father of Aristomachus, who led the third attempt to capture Mycenae and failed. He also had a daughter Lanassa, who married Neoptolemus and had by him several children, one of whom was named Pyrrhus. Cleodaeus had a heroon (hero-shrine) at Sparta.

Cleodaeus was also the name of a son of Heracles with an unnamed female slave of Omphale.
