= Staphylus of Naucratis =

Ancient Greek historian

Staphylus of Naucratis was an ancient Greek historian, geographer and mythographer quoted by Strabo (x. p. 475), Pliny (H. N. v. 31), and Athenaeus (ii. p. 45, c.), as well as by the scholiasts. He wrote a work on Thessaly (Schol. ad Apoll Rhod. iv. 816; Harpocrat. s. v. penestae; Schol. ad Aristoph. Nub. 1064), on Aeolia, Attica (Harpocration. s.v epiboion pronaia ), and on Arcadia (Sext. Empir. adv. Math. 116).
