= Aristodemus =

Legendary ancestor of the Spartan kings

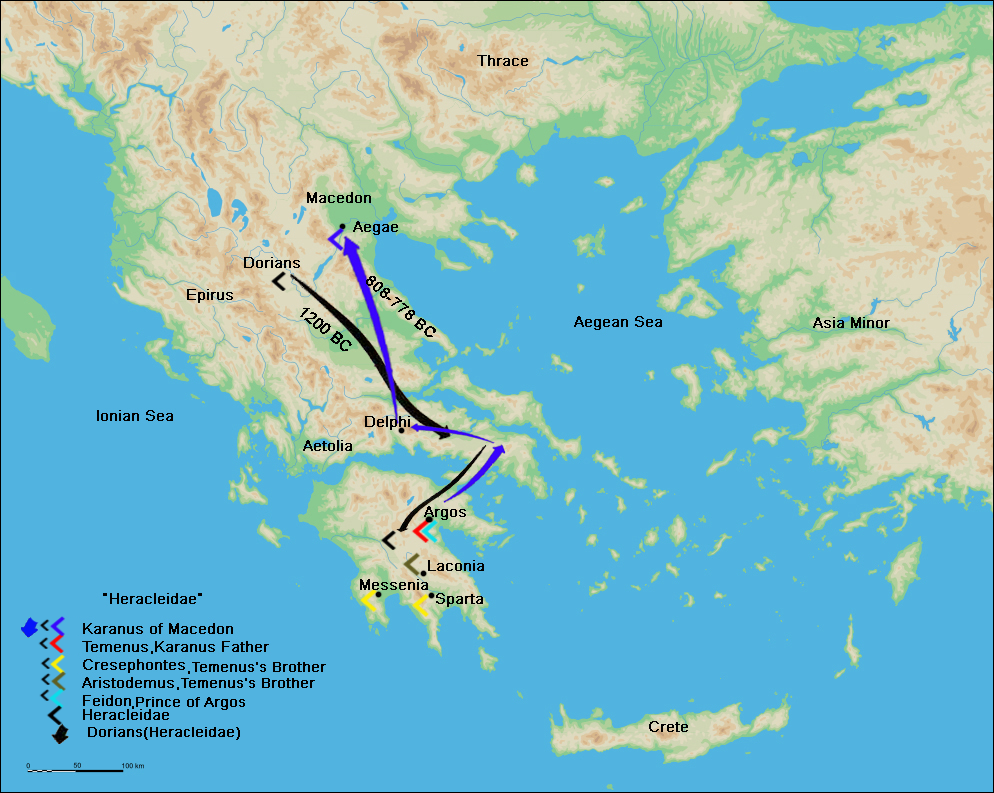
The Heracleidae attacks on the Peloponessus.

In Greek mythology, Aristodemus (Ancient Greek: Ἀριστόδημος) was one of the Heracleidae, son of Aristomachus and brother of Cresphontes and Temenus. He was a great-great-grandson of Heracles and helped lead the fifth and final attack on Mycenae in the Peloponnese.

Aristodemus and his brothers complained to the oracle that its instructions had proved fatal to those who had followed them; the oracle had told Hyllas to attack through the narrow passage when the third fruit was ripe. They received the answer that by the "third fruit" the "third generation" was meant, and that the "narrow passage" was not the isthmus of Corinth, but the straits of Rhium. They accordingly built a fleet at Naupactus, but before they set sail, Aristodemus was struck by lightning (or shot by Apollo) and the fleet destroyed, because one of the Heraclidae had slain an Acarnanian soothsayer.

His brothers were later able to conquer the Peloponnese.

By his wife Argia, daughter of King Autesion of Thebes, he was the father of twin kings Eurysthenes and Procles, the ancestors of the two royal houses of Sparta.

== General and cited sources ==
- Georg Busolt. Griechische Geschichte, Part I, Chapter 11, Section 7, where a list of authorities is given.
- Diodorus Siculus, iv. 57, 58.
- Euripides, Heraclidae.
- George Grote. History of Greece, Part I, Chapter XVIII.
- Herodotus, ix. 27.
- Karl Otfried Müller. Dorians, Part I, Chapter 3.
- Pausanias, i. 32, 41, ii. 13, 18, iii. I, iv. 3, v. 3.
- Pindar, Pythia, ix. 137.
- Connop Thirlwall. History of Greece, Chapter VII.
