= Aristomachus (mythology) =

In Greek mythology, Aristomachus (Ancient Greek: Ἀριστόμαχος, Ἀristómakhos) may refer to several figures including:

- Aristomachus, one of the sons of Talaus. He is the father of Hippomedon.
- Aristomachus, one of the Heraclidae, son of Cleodaeus, a great-grandson of Heracles. He led an attempt to capture Mycenae during the reign of Tisamenus, but, having misinterpreted the oracle, failed and fell in the battle. He is the father of Temenus, Cresphontes and Aristodemus.
- Aristomachus, one of the suitors of Hippodamia before Pelops, was killed by Oenomaus.
