= Aegimius =

Ancient Greek mythological figure

Aegimius (Ancient Greek: Αἰγίμιος, romanized: Aigimios) was the Greek mythological ancestor of the Dorians, who is described as their king and lawgiver at the time when they were yet inhabiting the northern parts of Thessaly.

== Mythology ==
Aegimius asked Heracles for help in a war against the Lapiths (who were led by Coronus who was an argonaut and the son of Caenus) and, in gratitude, offered him one-third of his kingdom. The Lapiths were conquered, but Heracles did not take for himself the territory promised to him by Aegimius, and left it in trust to the king, who was to preserve it for the sons of Heracles, the Heracleidae.

Aegimius had two sons, Dymas and Pamphylus, who migrated to the Peloponnese and were regarded as the ancestors of two branches of the Doric race, the Dymanes and the Pamphylians of Anatolia, while the third branch, the Hylleans, derived its name from Hyllas, the son of Heracles, who had been adopted by Aegimius.

There existed in antiquity an epic poem Aegimius of which a few fragments are extant, and which is sometimes ascribed to Hesiod and sometimes to Cercops of Miletus. The poem, printed among Hesiodic fragments, survives in fewer than a dozen quotations, and seems to have been in part concerned with the myth of Io and Argos Panoptes.
