= Ken Dowden =

English classical scholar (born 1950)

Ken Dowden (born 1950) is Professor Emeritus of Classics at the University of Birmingham, England.

Dowden is from Newcastle upon Tyne and studied at Worcester College, Oxford University. He came to Birmingham in 1988, acting as Head of the School of Humanities from 2000 to 2003, as Director of the Institute of Archaeology and Antiquity from 2005 to 2012, and as Head of the School of Philosophy, Theology and Religion from 2012 to 2016.

== Bibliography ==
- 1989, Death and the Maiden: Girls' Initiation Rites in Greek Mythology, London and New York: Routledge.
- 1992, Religion and the Romans, London: Bristol Classical Press.
- 1992, The Uses of Greek Mythology, London and New York: Routledge.
- 2000, European Paganism: the realities of cult from antiquity to the middle ages, London and New York: Routledge.
- 2006, Zeus, London & New York: Routledge.
- 2011, edited with Niall Livingstone, A Companion to Greek Mythology, Oxford and Malden, MA: Wiley-Blackwell. ISBN 978-1118785164
