= Jonathan M. Hall =

Jonathan Mark Hall is professor of Greek history at the University of Chicago. He earned a BA from the University of Oxford (Hertford College) in 1988 and a PhD from the University of Cambridge (King's College) in 1993 and he is the author of many books, including Ethnic Identity in Greek Antiquity, Hellenicity: Between Ethnicity and Culture, A History of the Archaic Greek World, ca. 1200–479 BCE, Artifact and Artifice: Classical Archaeology and the Ancient Historian, and Reclaiming the Past: Argos and its Archaeological Heritage in the Modern Era, as well as various articles and reviews on Archaic and Classical Greece. His focus of research is on Greek history, historiography, and archaeology. He received the Quantrell Teaching Award in 2009.

== Honors and awards ==
- 2009: Llewellyn John and Harriet Manchester Quantrell Award for Excellence in Undergraduate Teaching.
- 2005: 2004 Gordon J. Laing Award, presented by the University of Chicago Press.
- 1999: Charles J. Goodwin Award of Merit, presented by the American Philological Association
- 1998–1999: Junior Fellowship, Center for Hellenic Studies, Washington D.C.

== Publications ==
=== Monographs ===
- Reclaiming the Past: Argos and its Archaeological Heritage in the Modern World (2021).
- Artifact and Artifice: Classical Archaeology and the Ancient Historian (2014).
- The Blackwell History of the Archaic Greek World. Oxford: Basil Blackwell (2007).
- Hellenicity: Between Ethnicity and Culture. Chicago and London: University of Chicago Press (2002). Paperback edition, 2005. Recipient of the 2004 Gordon J. Laing Award from the University of Chicago Press.
- Ethnic Identity in Greek Antiquity. Cambridge: Cambridge University Press (1997). Paperback edition, 2000. Electronic edition, 2002. Recipient of the American Philological Association's 1999 Charles J. Goodwin Award for Merit.

=== Articles and contributions to edited volumes ===
- 'The rise of state action in the Archaic age', in H. Beck (ed.), A Companion to Ancient Greek Government. Malden, MA: Wiley-Blackwell (forthcoming).
- 'Early Greek settlement in the west: the limits of colonialism', in K. Bosher (ed.), Theatre Outside Athens: Drama in Greek Sicily and South Italy. Cambridge: Cambridge University Press (forthcoming).
- Articles on 'The Argive Heraion' and 'Argolis' in R. Bagnall et al. (eds.), An Encyclopedia of Ancient History. Oxford: Wiley-Blackwell (forthcoming).
- 'Autochthonous autocrats: the tyranny of the Athenian democracy', in K.O. Chong-Gossard, A. Turner and F. Vervaet (eds.), Private and Public Lies: The Discourse of Despotism and Deceit in the Ancient World, 11-28. Leiden: Brill (forthcoming).
- 'Imagining community beyond the polis: the emergence and transformation of the ethnos', in M. Lombardo (ed.), Forme sovrapoleiche e interpoleiche di organizzazione nel mondo greco antico. Lecce: Galatina (forthcoming).
- Articles on 'Ethnicity' and 'Greece: the Archaic Age', in M. Gagarin (ed.), Encyclopedia of Ancient Greece and Rome. New York and Oxford: Oxford University Press (2009).
- 'Ethnicity and cultural exchange', in K. Raaflaub and H. van Wees (eds.), A Companion to the Archaic Greek World, 604-17. Malden MA and Oxford: Basil Blackwell (2009).
- 'Foundation stories', in G. Tsetskhladze (ed.), Greek Colonisation. An Account of Greek Colonies and Other Settlements Overseas in the Archaic Period, Volume 2, 383-426. Leiden: Brill (2008).
- 'Politics and Greek myth', in R. Woodard (ed.), The Cambridge Companion to Greek Mythology, 331-54. Cambridge: Cambridge University Press (2008).
- 'International relations', in P. Sabin, H. van Wees and M. Whitby (eds.), The Cambridge History of Greek and Roman Warfare. Volume 1: Greece, the Hellenistic World and the Rise of Rome, 85-107. Cambridge: Cambridge University Press (2007).
- 'The creation and expression of identity in the Classical world: Greece', in S.E. Alcock and R. Osborne (eds.), Classical Archaeology (Blackwell Studies in Global Archaeology), 337-54. Oxford and New York: Basil Blackwell (2007).
- 'Polis, community and ethnic identity', in H. Alan Shapiro (ed.), The Cambridge Companion to Archaic Greece, 40-60. Cambridge: Cambridge University Press (2007).
- 'Arcades his oris. Greek projections on the Italian ethnoscape?', in E. Gruen (ed.), Cultural Borrowings and Ethnic Appropriations in Antiquity, 259-84. Stuttgart: Franz Steiner (2005).
- [With Catherine Morgan] 'Achaia', in M.H. Hansen and T. Heine Nielsen (eds.), An Inventory of Archaic and Classical Greek Poleis, 472-88. Oxford: Oxford University Press (2004).
- 'The Dorianization of the Messenians', in N. Luraghi and S.E. Alcock (eds.), Helots and their Masters in Laconia and Messenia: Histories, Ideologies, Structures, 134-60. Washington DC: Center for Hellenic Studies/Trustees for Harvard University (2003).
- 'How "Greek" were the early Western Greeks?', in K. Lomas (ed.), Greek Identity in the Western Mediterranean. Proceedings of an International Conference in Honour of Professor B.B. Shefton, F.B.A., 35-54. Leiden: Brill (2003).
- 'Culture, cultures and acculturation', in R. Rollinger and C. Ulf (eds.), Das Archaische Griechenland: Interne Entwicklungen -Externe Impulse, 35-50. Berlin: Akademie Verlag (2004).
- '"Culture" or "cultures"? Hellenism in the late sixth century', in C. Dougherty and L. Kurke (eds.), The Cultures Within Ancient Greek Culture. Contact, Conflict, Collaboration, 23-34. Cambridge and New York: Cambridge University Press (2003).
- 'Heroes, Hera and Herakleidai in the Argive Plain', in R. Hägg (ed.), Peloponnesian Sanctuaries and Cults (Skrifter Utgvina av Svenska Institutet i Athen 4, 48), 93-98. Stockholm: Åström (2002).
- 'Quem eram os Gregos?', Revista do Museu de Arqueologia e Etnologia, Universidade de São Paulo 11 (2001), 213-25 (in Portuguese, transl. M. B. Florenzano).
- [With Catherine Morgan] 'Akhaïkes poleis kai akhaïkos apoikismos', in A.D. Rizakis (ed.), Paysages d'Achaie II: Dymé et son territoire, 105-112 (in Greek, transl. I. Tournavitou). Athens and Paris: Centre for Hellenic and Roman Antiquity/National Research Foundation (2001).
- 'Contested ethnicities: perceptions of Macedonia within evolving definitions of Greek identity', in I. Malkin (ed.), Ancient Perceptions of Greek Ethnicity, 159-186. Washington, DC: Center for Hellenic Studies/Trustees for Harvard University (2001).
- Articles on 'Aeolians', 'Colonization', 'The Dark Age', 'Dorians', 'Hellenes', 'Ionians' and 'Political History to 490 BC', in G. Speake (ed.), Encyclopedia of Greece and the Hellenic Tradition. London and Chicago: Fitzroy Dearborn (2000).
- 'The east within the cultural identity of the cities of Magna Graecia', in Magna Grecia e Oriente mediterraneo prima dell'età ellenistica. Atti del 39º Convegno di Studi sulla Magna Grecia, Taranto 1-5 ottobre 1999, 389-401. Taranto: Istituto per la Storia e l'Archeologia della Magna Grecia (2000).
- 'Sparta, Lakedaimon and the nature of perioikic dependency', in P. Flensted-Jensen (ed.), Further Studies in the Ancient Greek Polis (Historia Einzelschriften 138), 73-89. Stuttgart: Franz Steiner (2000).
- 'Beyond the polis? The multilocality of heroes', in R. Hägg (ed.), Ancient Greek Hero Cult. Proceedings of the Fifth International Seminar on Ancient Greek Cult, Göteborg University, 21–23 April 1995 (Skrifter Utgivna av Svenska Institutet i Athen 8, 16), 49-59. Stockholm: Åström (1999).
- 'Alternative responses within polis formation: Argos, Mykenai and Tiryns', in H. Damgaard Andersen, H. Horsnaes and S. Houby-Nielsen (eds), Urbanization in the Mediterranean in the 9th to 6th Centuries BC. (Acta Hyperborea 7), 89-109. Copenhagen: Museum Tusculanum Press (1997).
- 'Going ethnic in Greece', Omnibus 31 (1996), 28-30.
- [With Catherine Morgan] 'Achaian poleis and Achaian colonisation', in M.H. Hansen (ed.), Introduction to an Inventory of Poleis. Acts of the Copenhagen Polis Centre 3, 164-232. Copenhagen: Det Kongelige Danske Videnskabernes Selskab (1996).
- 'The role of language in Greek ethnicities', Proceedings of the Cambridge Philological Society 41 (1995), 83-100.
- 'How Argive was the "Argive" Heraion? The political and cultic geography of the Argive Plain, 900-400 BC', American Journal of Archaeology 99 (1995), 577-613.
- 'Approaches to ethnicity in the Early Iron Age of Greece', in N. Spencer (ed.), Time, Tradition and Society in Greek Archaeology: Bridging the 'Great Divide', 6-17. London: Routledge (1995).
- 'Practising Postprocessualism? Classics and archaeological theory', Archaeological Review from Cambridge 10 (1991) 155-63.

=== Reviews ===
- N. Luraghi, The Ancient Messenians: Constructions of Ethnicity and Memory. Classical Philology 104 (2009), 516-22.
- D. Damakos & D. Plantzos (eds.), A Singular Antiquity: Archaeology and Hellenic Identity in Twentieth-Century Greece. Mediterranean Historical Review 24 (2009), 64-69.
- M. Kõiv, Ancient Tradition and Early Greek History. The Origins of States in Early-Archaic Sparta, Argos and Corinth. Classical Review 55 (2005), 196-8.
- J. Whitley, The Archaeology of Ancient Greece. Classical Philology 98 (2003) 290-6.
- P. Hunt, Slaves, Warfare, and Ideology in the Greek Historians. Classical Philology 94 (1999) 461-466.
- D. Tandy, Warriors into Traders: The Power of the Market in Early Greece. Classical Philology 94 (1999) 216-222.
- M. Piérart, Argos. Une ville grecque de 6000 ans. Journal of Hellenic Studies 119 (1999) 216-217.
- R. Hägg (ed.), The Role of Religion in the Early Greek Polis. Classical Philology 93 (1998) 271-276.
- A.D. Rizakis, Achaïe I: sources textuelles et histoire regionale. Journal of Hellenic Studies 117 (1997) 235.
- G. Casadio, Storia del culto di Dioniso in Argolide. Journal of Hellenic Studies 117 (1997) 224-225.
- 'Urban kin'. Review of O. Curty, Les parentés légendaires entre cités grecques. Classical Review 47 (1997) 94-96.
- R. Parker, Athenian Religion: A History. The Anglo-Hellenic Review 14 (1996) 19.
- I. Malkin, Myth and Territory in the Spartan Mediterranean and A. Powell & S. Hodkinson, The Shadow of Sparta. Journal of Hellenic Studies 116 (1996) 213-15.
- W. Nippel, Griechen, Barbaren und Wilde – Alte Geschichte und Sozialanthropologie, and Fondation Hardt, Hérodote et les peuples non-grecs. Journal of Hellenic Studies 112 (1992) 194-96.
- 'Black Athena: a sheep in wolf's clothing?', Journal of Mediterranean Archaeology 3 (1990) 247-54.
