= Tisamenus =

Tisamenus (Ancient Greek: Τισαμενός) is the name of several people in classical history and mythology:

Mythology

- Tisamenus (son of Orestes), mythological king of Argos, and son of Orestes and Hermione.
- Tisamenus (King of Thebes), a king of Thebes, son of Thersander and Demonassa.

History

- Tisamenus of Elis, son of Antiochus, an ancient Greek seer and grandfather of the seer Agias of Sparta
- Tisamenus, a descendant apparently of the above, who took part in the conspiracy of Cinadon, and was put to death for it in 397 BC.

== Namesake ==
- Tisamenus (insect), a genus of stick insects in the family Heteropterygidae
