= List of people mentioned in Herodotus, Book One =

People mentioned in "The Histories" by Herodotus

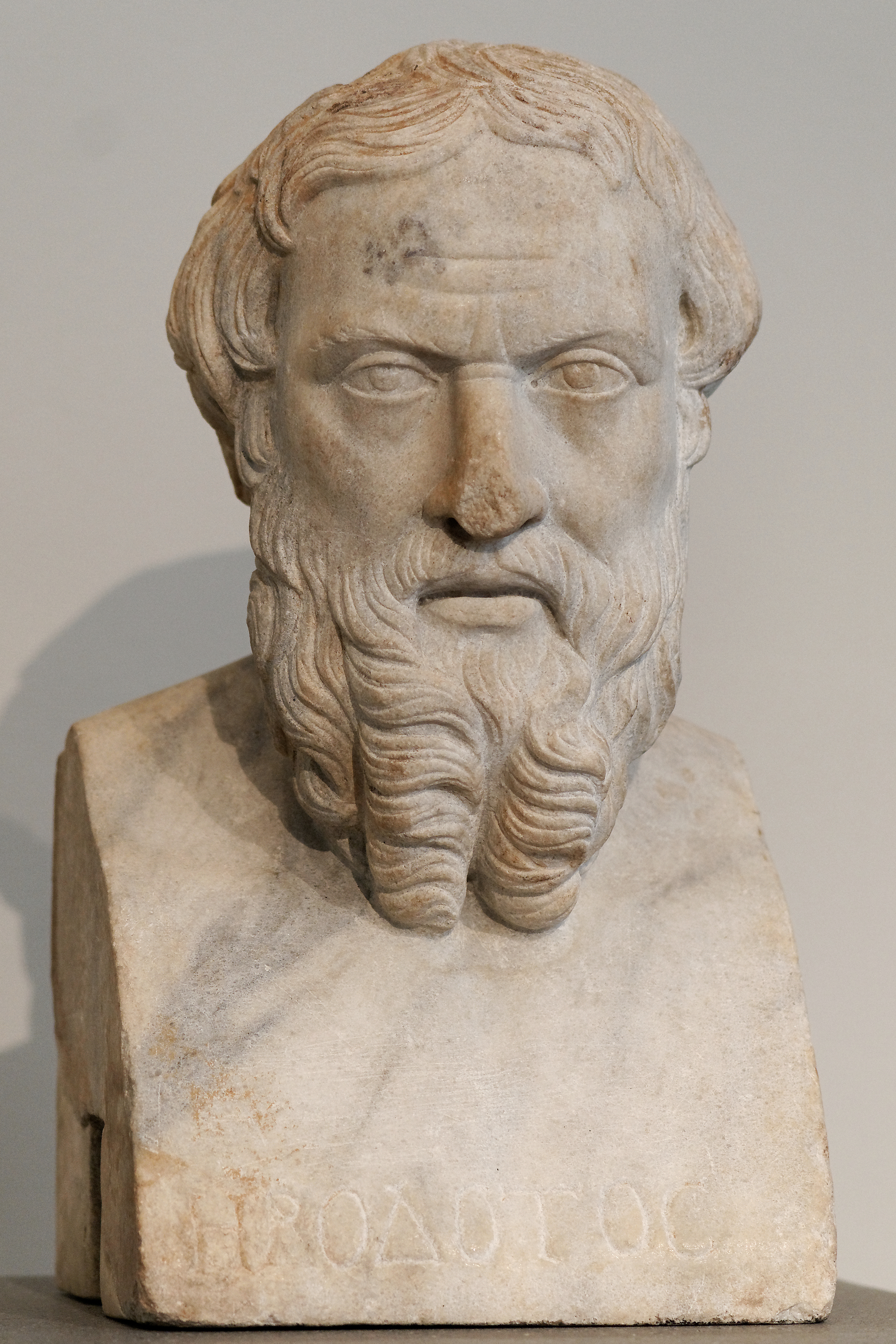
Roman copy (2nd century AD) of a Greek bust of Herodotus from the first half of the 4th century BC.

This article presents a list of people whom Herodotus (c.484–c.425 BC) mentioned in Book One of his major work The Histories. Herodotus presented his theme as "recording the achievements of both our own (Greek) and other peoples; and more particularly, to show how they came into conflict". Structurally, The Histories is sub-divided into nine books, each of which is sometimes named after one of the nine Muses. The work contains numerous digressions but the theme is constant. Although Herodotus' references range from the Trojan War of the 2nd millennium BC to the Peloponnesian War in his own lifetime, the essential scope of the entire work is a record of events from the reign of Cyrus the Great (c.553–c.529 BC) to the defeat of Xerxes I in 479 BC. Book One ends with the death of Cyrus.

Some of the people named by Herodotus are legendary, or at least semi-legendary. Dates and places are given where known and notes are provided to indicate the role and/or importance played by each person in The Histories. Page numbers are those in the Burn/de Sélincourt edition published by Penguin Books in 1975, based on de Sélincourt's 1954 translation.

== Key ==
Legend
Key	Description
Book	Book number (Roman numeral) and page number of The Histories (Penguin 1975 edition) in which the person is first mentioned.
Name	The name of the individual as given by Herodotus.
State	Individual cities were in effect city-states and so a city or a country is appropriate.
Lifetime	Birth and death dates are given if known; otherwise a timespan in which the person flourished.
Role, events and notes	A brief summary of what the person was or did, according to Herodotus, with optional clarification.
Other sources	Other books which verify the Herodotus reference. Some of the more obscure references may be unique to Herodotus.

== List ==
Book	Name	State	Lifetime	Role, events and notes	Other sources
I. 41	Herodotus	Halicarnassus	c.484–c.425 BC	Herodotus began by introducing himself and stating his theme of showing how the Greeks and "other peoples" (principally the Persians) came into conflict.	
I. 41	Io	Argos	legendary	Daughter of Inachus. Herodotus says she was seized by Phoenician sailors and taken to Egypt. In wider legend, Io was beloved by Zeus and became the mother of Epaphus, aka Apis, the legendary Egyptian ruler who founded Memphis.	
I. 41	Inachus	Argos	legendary	King of Argos and father of Io. In wider legend, he was the first-ever Argive king and a river was named after him.	
I. 42	Europa	Tyre	legendary	Daughter of Agenor, the Phoenician king of Tyre. Seized by Cretan sailors as revenge for the abduction of Io and taken to Crete. Other legends hold that she was abducted by Zeus and became the mother of Minos.	
I. 42	Medea	Colchis	legendary	Daughter of King Aeëtes of Colchis. Abducted by Greek sailors as further revenge for the abduction of Io. In other legends, Medea is a sorceress who encounters Jason and the Argonauts, falling in love with Jason.	
I. 42	Paris	Troy	legendary	Son of Priam, King of Troy. His abduction of Helen, Queen of Sparta, was the catalyst of the Trojan War.	
I. 42	Priam	Troy	legendary	King of Troy through the Trojan War.	
I. 42	Helen of Troy	Sparta	legendary	Queen of Sparta who was abducted by Paris. The Trojan War was waged because the Greek states united against Troy to return her to Sparta.	
I. 43	Maeonians	Lydia	2nd millennium BC	The Homeric name for the Lydian people in the 2nd millennium. Herodotus says they were known as Maeonian until they took the name Lydian from Lydus.	
I. 43	Atys	Lydia	2nd millennium BC	King of the Maeonians and father of Lydus.	
I. 43	Lydus	Lydia	2nd millennium BC	Succeeded his father Atys as king of the Maeonians and gave his name to the country and its people. His line continued until the time of Agron.	
I. 43	Heracles	Thebes	legendary	Mentioned here only as the father of Alcaeus of Lydia and founder of the Heracleidae.	
I. 43	Iardanus	Lydia	legendary	Mentioned re his slave-girl with whom Heracles had an affair.	
I. 43	Alcaeus	Lydia	legendary	Son of Heracles and a first generation member of the Heracleidae (Heraclids). His mother may have been Omphale. Herodotus asserts that Alcaeus' great-grandson Agron was the first of the Heracleidae to reign at Sardis as king of Lydia. According to Diodorus Siculus, Alcaeus had the alternative name of Cleolaus. See also: List of kings of Lydia.	
I. 43	Belus	Lydia	semi-legendary	Son of Alcaeus. Not to be confused with the Assyrian Belus.	
I. 43	Ninus	Lydia	semi-legendary	Son of Belus and grandson of Alcaeus. Not to be confused with the Assyrian Ninus.	
I. 43	Agron	Lydia	semi-legendary	Son of Ninus, grandson of Belus and great-grandson of Alcaeus. The first Heraclid to rule in Sardis.	
I. 44	Myrsus	Lydia	8th century BC	Heraclid king of Lydia who was also known as Meles. Mentioned briefly as the father of Candaules.	
I. 43	Candaules	Lydia	8th to 7th century BC	Known as Myrsilos by the Greeks. The last Heraclid king of Lydia.	
I. 44	Nyssia	Lydia	8th to 7th century BC	The wife of Candaules and Gyges. Unnamed by Herodotus who tells the story of her exposure to Gyges by Candaules.	
I. 43	Mermnadae	Lydia	c.687–c.546 BC	Mentioned as the family of Croesus. The Mermnads succeeded the Heraclids as kings of Lydia. The Mermnad line was Gyges, Ardys, Sadyattes, Alyattes and Croesus.	
I. 44	Dascylus	Lydia	8th century BC	Briefly mentioned as the father of Gyges.	
I. 44	Gyges	Lydia	reigned c.687–c.652 BC	First Mermnad king of Lydia, having killed Candaules.	
I. 45	Archilochus	Paros	c.680–c.640 BC	His poems survive as fragments and one of these, which Herodotus calls his Satires, is a source for the "wealth of Gyges".	
I. 46	Ardys	Lydia	reigned c.652–c.603 BC	King of Lydia who was the son of Gyges. Waged continuous war against the Cimmerian invaders who at one point captured Sardis except for its citadel.	
I. 46	Sadyattes	Lydia	reigned c.603–c.591 BC	King of Lydia who was the son of Ardys and the father of Alyattes. Began the war against Miletus which was continued by Alyattes.	
I. 43	Alyattes	Lydia	reigned c.591–560 BC	King of Lydia and the father of Croesus. Drove out the Cimmerians and eventually resolved the war against Miletus. Made war on Cyaxares of Media.	
I. 43	Croesus	Lydia	595–c.546 BC reigned 560–546 BC	Introduced as king of all the peoples to the west of the river Halys and (contradicting what is written about Sadyattes and Alyattes) as the first foreigner known to have made direct contact with Greek communities in terms of either conquest or alliance. Croesus overran mainland Aeolis, Doris and Ionia, all of which paid him tribute. He later made a pact of friendship with Sparta.	
I. 46	Pythia (priestess of the Delphic Oracle)				
I. 46	Cypselus				
I. 46	Eëtion				
I. 46	Gordias				
I. 46	Midas				
I. 46	Cyaxares				
I. 46	Deioces				
I. 70	Syennesis	Cilicia	early 6th century	King of Cilicia who negotiated peace between Lydia and Medea after the solar eclipse on 28 May 585	

== Sources ==
- Aristotle (1999). Gerber, Douglas E. (ed.). Rhetoric. Loeb Classical Library. ISBN 9780674995819.
- Bury, J. B.; Meiggs, Russell (1975) [first published 1900]. A History of Greece (Fourth ed.). London: MacMillan Press. ISBN 0-333-15492-4.
- Speake, Graham, ed. (1994). Dictionary of Ancient History. London: Penguin Books. ISBN 0-14-044034-8.
- Grote, George (1847). A History of Greece, Volume III. London: John Murray.
- Hammond, N. G. L.; Scullard, H. H. (1970). The Oxford Classical Dictionary (2nd ed.). Oxford: Clarendon Press. ISBN 0-198-69117-3.
- Herodotus (1975) [first published 1954]. Burn, A. R.; de Sélincourt, Aubrey (eds.). The Histories. London: Penguin Books. ISBN 0-14-051260-8.
- Locke, Elizabeth; Savill, Sheila, eds. (1976). Pears Encyclopaedia of Myths and Legends. London: Pelham Books. ISBN 9780720710014.
- Thucydides (1972) [first published 1954]. Warner, Rex; Finley, M. I. (eds.). History of the Peloponnesian War. London: Penguin Books. ISBN 0-14-044039-9.
