= Tyllus =

Lydian Autochthon in Greek mythology

In Greek mythology, Tyllus is an Autochthon of Lydia. (Note: Lydia was then probably known as Maeonia, for which its first king, Manes, was probably eponymous.) He was the father of Halie, who married Cotys, an early king of Lydia (perhaps one of the Maeoniae). (Note: This is according to Dionysius of Halicarnassus; Herodotus does not mention Cotys.) Tyllus is attested by only one author: Dionysius of Halicarnassus, in his Roman Antiquities. However, the same family tree of the early Kings of Lydia can be in Herodotus and Xanthus.

The term autochthon is an Ancient Greek word which translates as someone that "sprung from the earth itself". It refers to the indigenous people of a region or area. This means that Tyllus is a native of Lydia (modern day Western Turkey) of the late 2nd millennium BC.

== Dionysius of Halicarnassus ==
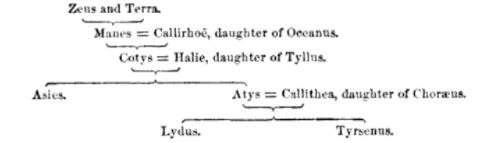
Family tree of Tyllus, according to Dionysius of Halicarnassus.

Dionysius of Halicarnassus, in the first Book of his Roman Antiquities, makes Manes the son of Zeus and Gaia. He also puts Callithea as the mother of Atys.

This version given by Dionysius of Halicarnassus differs to that of Herodotus in that it makes Atys the grandson of Manes, rather than his son. This could have been because Herodotus's genealogy was not the full one, and this discrepancy was a mistake or alteration upon his part.

== Herodotus ==
According to Herodotus in the first chapter of the Histories, Tyllus was the father of Halie, who married Cotys, a son of Manes, an early king of Lydia. The children of Halie and Cotys (the grandchildren of Tyllus) were Atys and Asies, after whom the Lydians claim the continent of Asia was named. Atys, after his father died, became king of Lydia. Atys had two sons, Lydus and Tyrrhenus, after whom, according to the Greeks, the Lydian people and the Tyrrhenians (the Etruscans) were named, respectively.

Herodotus then contradicts himself later on when he says "Asies, the son of Cotys, who was the son of Manes..."

== Other authors ==
Atys was claimed by Strabo and to have been a descendant of Heracles and Omphale.

== Family tree ==
Zeus	Gaia	Oceanus
Manes	Callirrhoe	Tyllus
Choraeus	Cotys	Halie
Callithea	Atys	Asies
Tyrrhenus	Lydus

== See also ==
- Kings of Lydia

== Sources ==
=== Primary ===
- Herodotus. The Histories. Translated by A.D. Godley at Perseus.com
- Dionysius of Halicarnassus. Roman Antiquities. Translated by Earnest Cary and Edward Spelman at ToposText.org

=== Secondary ===
- Rawlinson, George (1875). The History of Herodotus.
