= Dascylium (disambiguation) =

Dascylium was a city in ancient Mysia or Bithynia, capital of Hellespontine Phrygia.

Dascylium or Daskylion (Ancient Greek: Δασκύλιον) or Daskyleion (Δασκυλεῖον) may also refer to:

- Dascylium (Aeolis), a town of ancient Aeolis
- Dascylium (Bithynia), a town of ancient Bithynia on the Sea of Marmara, Anatolia
- Dascylium (Caria), a town of ancient Caria near Ephesus, Anatolia
- Dascylium (southern Caria), a town of ancient Caria further south than the prior, Anatolia
- Dascylium (Ionia), a town of ancient Ionia, Anatolia
