= Gyges =

Gyges can refer to:

- One of the Hecatoncheires from Greek mythology
- King Gyges of Lydia
- Ogyges
- Ring of Gyges
