= Agron of Lydia =

Legendary king of Lydia

Agron (fl. c. 1192 BC) was a legendary king of Lydia who is named by Herodotus as the first of the Lydian Heraclid dynasty. His father is named by Herodotus as Ninus, the mythical founder of Nineveh and a descendant of Šanta, an Assyrian sun god.

Before he assumed the throne, the ruling family had been the Maeonian line of Lydus, from whom the country's name was derived. According to Herodotus, the Heraclid dynasty in Lydia reigned continuously through 22 generations for 505 years. The last of the line was Candaules, whose date of death was c. 687 BC, so Herodotus' computation suggests c. 1192 BC for Agron's accession.

== See also ==
- List of kings of Lydia

== Sources ==
- Herodotus (1975) [first published 1954]. Burn, A. R.; de Sélincourt, Aubrey (eds.). The Histories. London: Penguin Books. ISBN 0-14-051260-8.
- Bury, J. B.; Meiggs, Russell (1975) [first published 1900]. A History of Greece (Fourth ed.). London: MacMillan Press. ISBN 0-333-15492-4.
