= Manes of Lydia =

Mythical early king of Lydia

Manes (Ancient Greek: Μάνης) is a legendary figure of the 2nd millennium BC who is attested by Herodotus in Book One of Histories to have been an early king of Lydia, then probably known as Maeonia (which he may be the eponym of). He was believed to have been the son of Zeus and Gaia, and was the father of Atys, who succeeded him as king. Atys, through Callithea, fathered Lydus, after whom the Lydian people were later named, and Tyrrhenus, after whom the Tyrrhenians were named. Later, in Book Four, Herodotus states that Manes had another son called Cotys, who, through Halie, had a son called Asies, after whom the Lydians claimed that the continent of Asia is named. Dionysius of Halicarnassus names Callirhoe, daughter of Oceanus, as the mother of Cotys by Manes, and Atys as the son of Cotys.

== Genealogy ==
Manes' family tree

Zeus	Gaia	Oceanus	Tethys
MANES	Callirrhoe	Tyllus
Choraeus	Cotys	Halie
Callithea	Atys	Asies
Sardo	Tyrrhenus	Lydus

== See also ==
- List of kings of Lydia
