= Hercules and Omphale (Rubens) =

Painting by Peter Paul Rubens

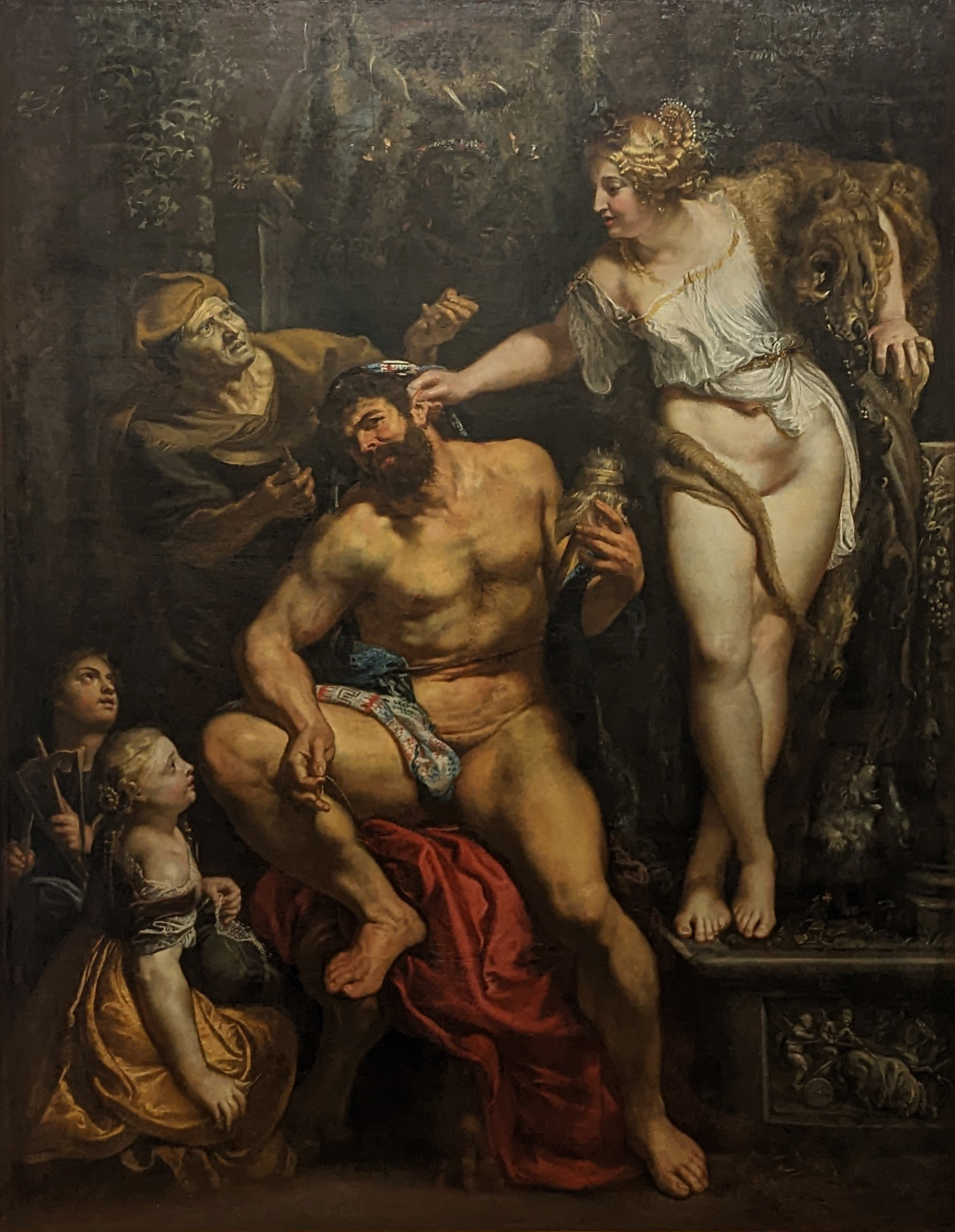
- Artist: Peter Paul Rubens
- Year: c. 1602
- Medium: oil paint, canvas
- Dimensions: 278 cm (109 in) × 215 cm (85 in)
- Location: Room 802
- Owner: French State
- Accession: INV 854, RF 1938-46

Hercules and Omphale is a circa 1602 painting by Peter Paul Rubens, now held in the Louvre Museum in Paris.

It measures 278 by 216 cm and shows Hercules and Omphale.
