= List of kings of Lydia =

This article lists the known kings of Lydia, both legendary and historical. Lydia was an ancient kingdom in western Anatolia during the first millennium BC. It may have originated as a country in the second millennium BC and was possibly called Maeonia at one time, given that Herodotus says the people were called Maeonians before they became known as Lydians. Herodotus and other sources refer to three dynasties: the Maeoniae, Heracleidae (Heraclids) and Mermnadae. The first two are legendary, though later members of the Heraclid dynasty are at least semi-legendary. The Mermnadae are historical.

== Maeoniae ==
The earliest Maeonian or Lydian king mentioned by Herodotus is Manes who was the father of Atys. There was a severe famine during the reign of Atys and half of the citizens, led by Atys' son Tyrrhenus, emigrated to Italy as the Tyrrhenians. Other sources, such as Strabo, name Tmolus and his son Tantalus as kings of the region about the same time, supposedly ruling from the land about Mount Sipylus, but it is asserted that these two were the same people as Manes and Atys, especially as Omphale is a member of both families. Dionysius of Halicarnassus instead puts Cotys as the son of Manes, and as the father of Atys.

The known legendary kings are:

- Manes
- Atys, son of Manes
- Lydus, son of Atys

Herodotus says that Lydus gave his name to the country and its people. The line of Lydus continued through an unstated number of generations until they, as Herodotus says, "turned over the management of affairs to the Heraclids". He adds that the Heraclids in Lydia were the descendants of Heracles and a slave-girl belonging to Iardanus; the line was from Heracles through Alcaeus, Belus and Ninus to Agron who was the first Heraclid king of Lydia.

== Heraclidae ==
A Heraclid royal family succeeded the Maeoniae ruled, but sources differ as to their maternal parentage and lineage. The Heraclids are widely agreed to have been descended from Heracles and a woman of Iardanus, but sources differ on whether this woman was his girl or his illustrious daughter, Queen Omphale.

Herodotus writes that Heracles sired this dynasty with a slave-girl of Iardanus (who, since she was unnamed in Herodotus' account, might be Omphale). In this account, the first of this line to rule was their great-great-grandson, named Agron. After Agron, Lydia would be ruled by Heraclid kings over 22 generations for 505 years. This line of kings would include Meles, followed by his son Candaules. Candaules was infamous for his voyeuristic appetites (see candaulism and the Ring of Gyges). He would be overthrown and usurped by his servant Gyges, who would go on to found the Mermnad dynasty.

However, most other sources say the Heraclids of Lydia were not descended from Iardanus' anonymous slave-girl, but from his daughter Omphale - a Lydian queen who held Heracles in servitude for a year. Their romance was characterised by an inversion of gender norms, with Omphale taking the masculine role and Heracles taking the feminine role in both social and sexual contexts. Pseudo-Apollodorus writes that the Lydian Heraclids were descended Omphale and Heracles' son Agelaus, who would go on to be an ancestor of Crœsus. Dionysus of Halicarnassus also writes that Heracles and Omphale sired royal children, such as Tyrrhenus, founder of the Etruscans. This might be supported by Pausanias, who writes that Heracles had a Lydian son named Tyrsenus, which is used in other texts as a variation of Tyrrhenus. According to Xanthus of Lydia, the Heraclid dynasty of Lydia traced their descent to a son of Heracles and Omphale named Tylon, and were called Tylonidai. "Tylon" is a variation of Tylos, a native Anatolian deity interpreted as Heracles.

== Mermnadae ==
Although this dynasty is historical, the dates for it have never been determined with certainty. The traditional dates are derived from Herodotus, who gives some reign-lengths, but these have been questioned by modern scholars on the basis of synchronisms with Assyrian history. The name of the dynasty (Ancient Greek: Μερμνάδαι) may be attested in Lydian transmission as -𐤪𐤷𐤦𐤪𐤫𐤠 mλimna-. Etymologically, it possibly contains the Carian word mno- 'son' or 'descendant', which would then represent an argument for the Carian origin of the Mermnad clan.

There were five kings, all historical figures, in the Mermnad line:

- Gyges, aka Guges (c.680–c.644 BCE; husband of Candaules' widow)
- Ardys, aka Ardysus (c.644–c.637 BC; son of Gyges)
- Sadyattes (c.637–c.635 BCE; son of Ardys)
- Alyattes (c.635–585 BCE; son of Sadyattes)
- Croesus, aka Kroisos (c.585–546 BC; son of Alyattes)

Gyges died in battle c.644 BCE, fighting against the Cimmerians, and was succeeded by Ardys. The most successful king was Alyattes, under whom Lydia reached its peak of power and prosperity. Croesus was defeated by Cyrus the Great at the battles of Pteria and Thymbra. Cyrus annexed Lydia after the Siege of Sardis which ended in early 546 BC, but the fate of Croesus himself is uncertain.

=== Genealogy ===
Dascylus
Gyges
Ardys
Sadyattes	Lyde	Miletus	Median dynasty
Greek woman	Alyattes	Carian noblewoman	Cyaxares
Pantaleon	Croesus	Aryenis	Astyages	Achaemenid dynasty
Atys	Mandane	Cambyses I
Amytis	Cyrus II

Consanguineous relatives of Gyges

== Sources ==
- Bury, J. B.; Meiggs, Russell (1975) [first published 1900]. A History of Greece (Fourth ed.). London: MacMillan Press. ISBN 0-333-15492-4.
- Herodotus (1975) [first published 1954]. Burn, A. R.; de Sélincourt, Aubrey (eds.). The Histories. London: Penguin Books. ISBN 0-14-051260-8.
