= Halie =

Name of multiple characters in Greek mythology

Halia or Halie (Ancient Greek: Ἁλίη or Ἁλία, Haliê lit. 'the dweller in the sea' or 'the briney') is the name of the following characters in Greek mythology:

- Halie, the "ox-eyed" Nereid, sea-nymph daughter of the 'Old Man of the Sea' Nereus and the Oceanid Doris. Halia and her other sisters appear to Thetis when she cries out in sympathy for the grief of Achilles at the slaying of his friend Patroclus.
- Halia, a nymph who lived on an island that would later be named Rhodes after her only daughter, Rhodos (or Rhode). Halia was the daughter of Thalassa, sister of the Telchines, and mother of Rhodos and six sons by Poseidon. Shortly after Aphrodite’s birth, the goddess was traveling the oceans. When Halia’s young sons unfairly and inhospitably refused to let Aphrodite land upon their shore, the goddess cursed them with insanity, for their lack of hospitality. In their madness, they raped Halia. As punishment, Poseidon buried them in the island’s sea-caverns. Halia later threw herself into the sea; Rhodians argue that she became the goddess Leucothea. However, Leucothea is identified with Ino in all other sources.
- Halia, daughter of Sybaris. In a sacred grove of Artemis, she encountered an enormous serpent that mated with her; their offspring were the first members of the clan Ophiogeneis ("Serpent-born").
- Halie, daughter of Tyllus, an autochthon. She married Cotys, son of Manes, an early king of Lydia, bearing him two sons, Asies and Atys, who succeeded Manes as king of Lydia.
- The plural form, haliae, is used as a name for marine nymphs in general.

== See also ==
- Hali (disambiguation)
- Hayley (given name), including variant spellings
- Haley (surname)
