= Omphale =

Daughter of Iardanus, in Greek mythology

- Queen of Lydia
- Member of the Royal House of Lydia
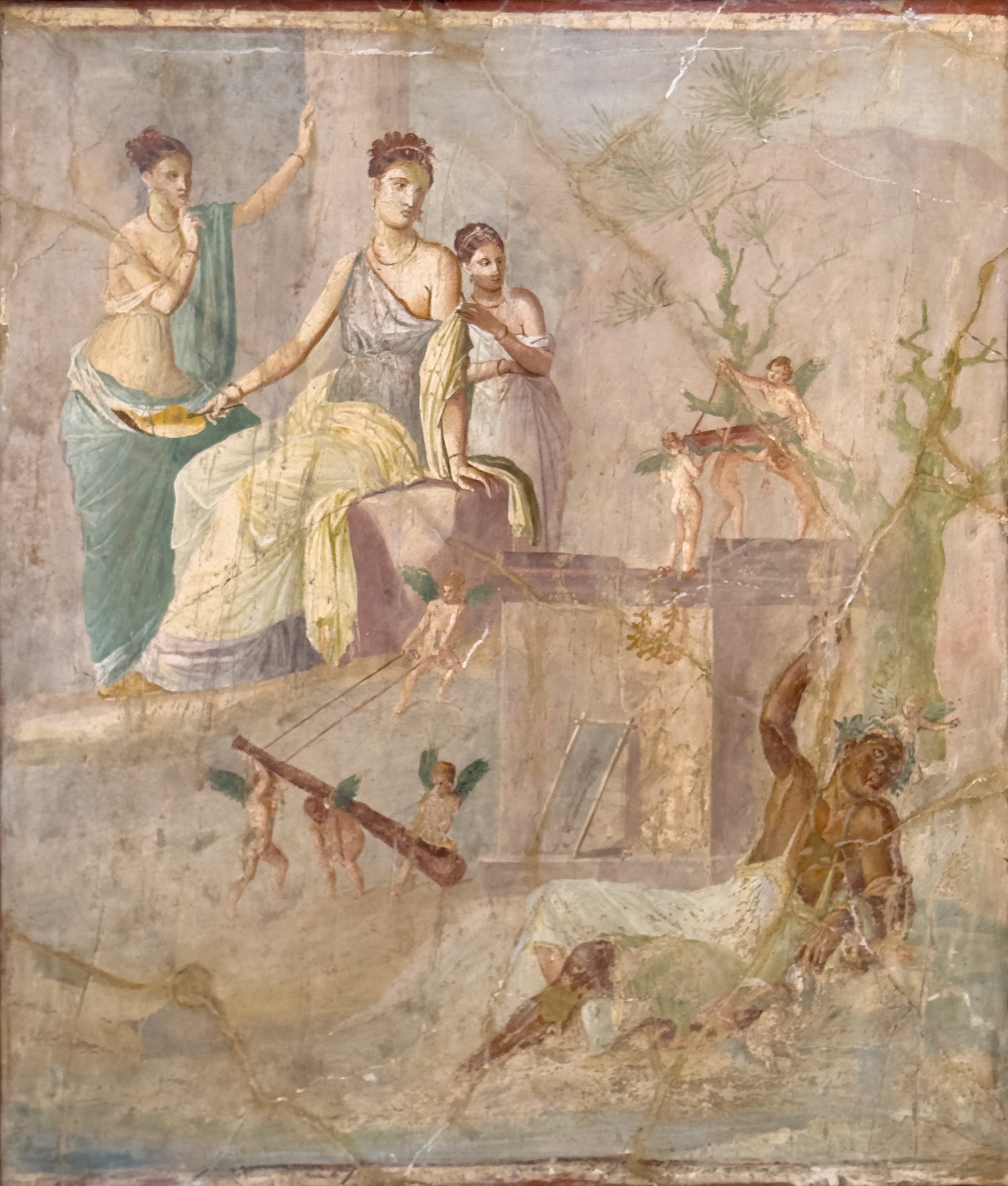
- In an ancient fresco from the home of the Prince of Montenegro at Pompeii, a drunken, cross-dressing Heracles is on the ground as Omphale and maidservants look on from above.
- Abode: Lydia

Genealogy
- Parents: Iardanus (or Iardanes)
- Consort: Tmolus, Heracles
- Children: Sons by Heracles

In Greek mythology, Omphale (/ˈɒmfəˌliː/; Ancient Greek: Ὀμφάλη, romanized: Omphale, lit. 'navel') was princess of the kingdom of Lydia in Asia Minor. Diodorus Siculus provides the first appearance of the Omphale theme in literature, though Aeschylus was aware of the episode. The Greeks did not recognize her as a goddess: the undisputed etymological connection with omphalos, the world-navel, has never been made clear. In her best-known myth, she is the mistress of the hero Heracles during a year of required servitude.

== Family ==
According to Diodorus Siculus, Omphale was the daughter of Iardanus while according to the mythographer Apollodorus, the name of her father was Iardanes, and she was the wife of Tmolus, a king of Lydia from whom she inherited his throne.

== Mythology ==
=== Heracles and Omphale ===
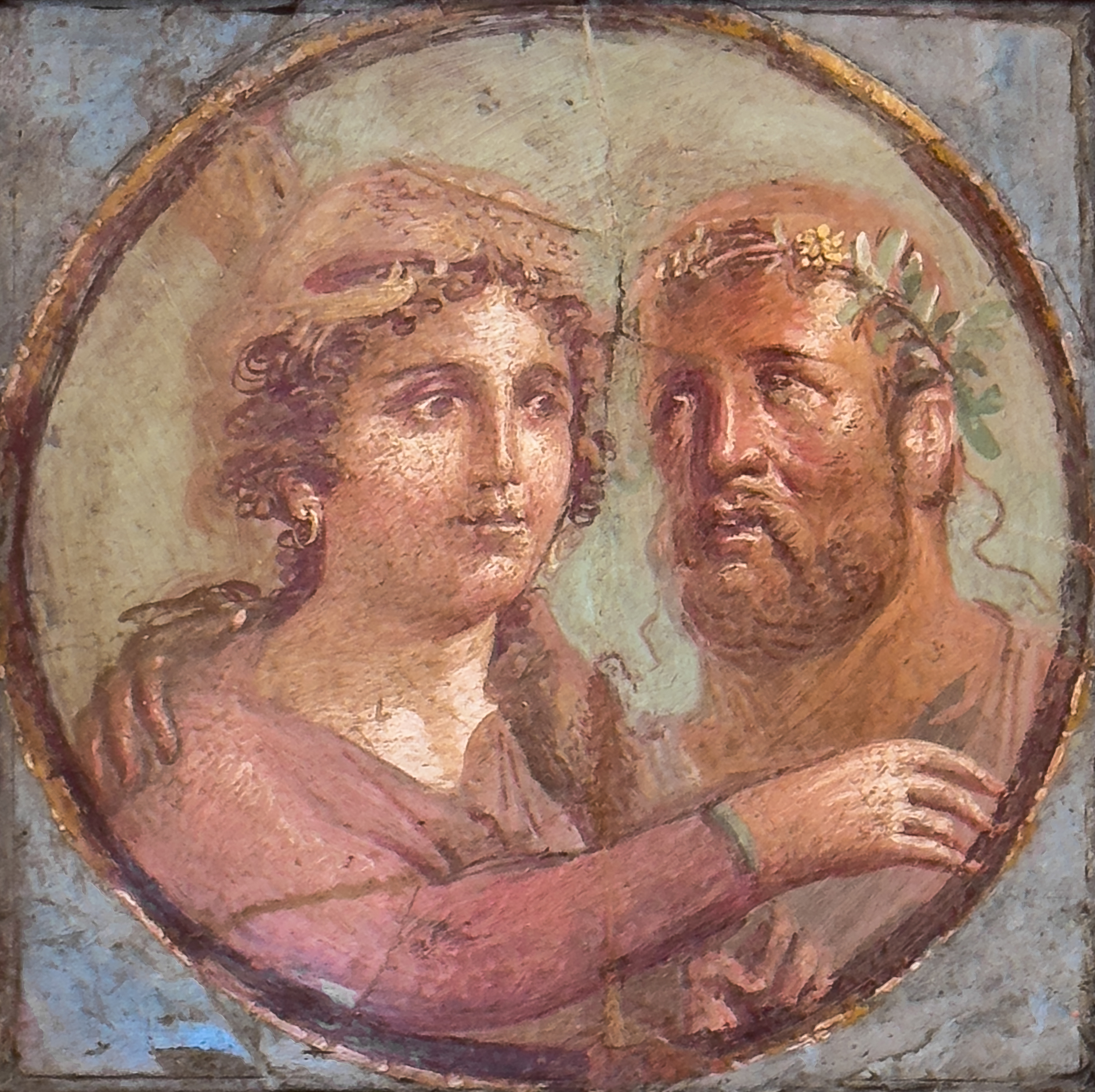
Heracles and Omphale, each wearing the other’s clothing, Roman fresco tondo, Pompeian Fourth Style (45-79 AD), Naples National Archaeological Museum, Italy

The great hero Heracles, whom the Romans identified as Hercules, "inadvertently" murdered Iphitus. In one of many Greek variations on the theme the penalty was, by the command of the Delphic Oracle Xenoclea, that he be remanded as a slave to Omphale for the period of a year, the compensation to be paid to Eurytus, who refused it. (According to Diodorus, Iphitus' sons accepted it.)

The theme, inherently a comic inversion of sexual roles, is not fully illustrated in any surviving text from Classical Greece. Plutarch, in his life of Pericles, 24, mentions lost comedies of Kratinos and Eupolis, which alluded to the contemporary capacity of Aspasia in the household of Pericles, and to Sophocles in The Trachiniae it was shameful for Heracles to serve an Oriental woman in this fashion, but there are many late Hellenistic and Roman references in texts and art to Heracles being forced to do women's work and even wear women's clothing and hold a basket of wool while Omphale and her maidens did their spinning. Omphale even wore the skin of the Nemean Lion and carried Heracles' olive-wood club. No full early account survives to supplement the later vase-paintings.

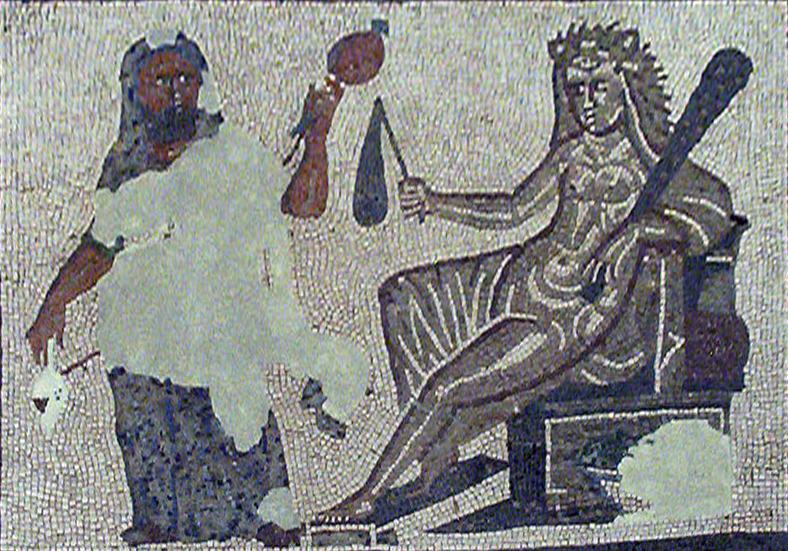
Hercules and Omphale, detail of a Roman mosaic from Llíria (Spain), third century.

But it was also during his stay in Lydia that Heracles captured the city of the Itones and enslaved them, killed Syleus who forced passersby to hoe his vineyard, and then captured the Cercopes.

After some time, Omphale freed Heracles and took him as her husband. They travelled to the grove of Dionysus and planned to celebrate the rites of Dionysus at dawn. Heracles slept alone in a bed covered with the clothes of Omphale. The Greek god Pan hoped to have his way with Omphale and crept naked into the bed of Heracles who threw Pan to the floor and laughed.

=== Sons of Heracles in Lydia ===
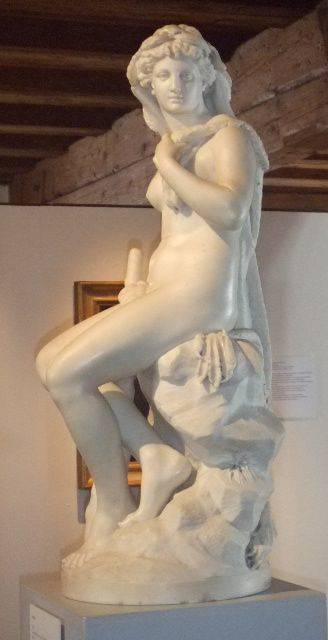
Omphale, by Constantin Dausch

Diodorus Siculus (4.31.8) and Ovid in his Heroides (9.54) mention a son named Lamos. But Bibliotheca (2.7.8) gives the name of the son of Heracles and Omphale as Agelaus, whom the family of Croesus was descended from.

Pausanias (2.21.3) gives yet another name, mentioning Tyrsenus, son of Heracles by "the Lydian woman", by whom Pausanias presumably means Omphale. This Tyrsenus supposedly first invented the trumpet, and Tyrsenus' son Hegeleus taught the Dorians with Temenus how to play the trumpet and first gave to Athena the surname Trumpet.

The name Tyrsenus appears elsewhere as a variant of Tyrrhenus, whom many accounts bring from Lydia to settle the Tyrsenoi/ Tyrrhenians/ Etruscans in Italy. Dionysius of Halicarnassus (1.28.1) cites a tradition that the supposed founder of the Etruscan settlements was Tyrrhenus, the son of Heracles by Omphale the Lydian, who drove the Pelasgians out of Italy from the cities north of the Tiber river. Dionysius gives this as an alternate to other versions of Tyrrhenus' ancestry.

Herodotus (1.7) refers to a Heraclid dynasty of kings who ruled Lydia, yet were perhaps not descended from Omphale, writing, "The Heraclids, descended from Heracles and the slave-girl of Iardanus...." Omphale as slave-girl seems odd. However, Diodorus Siculus relates that when Heracles was still Omphale's slave, before Omphale (daughter of Iardanus) set Heracles free and married him, Heracles fathered a son, Cleodaeus, on a slave-woman. This fits, though in Herodotus the son of Heracles and the slave-girl of Iardanus is named Alcaeus.

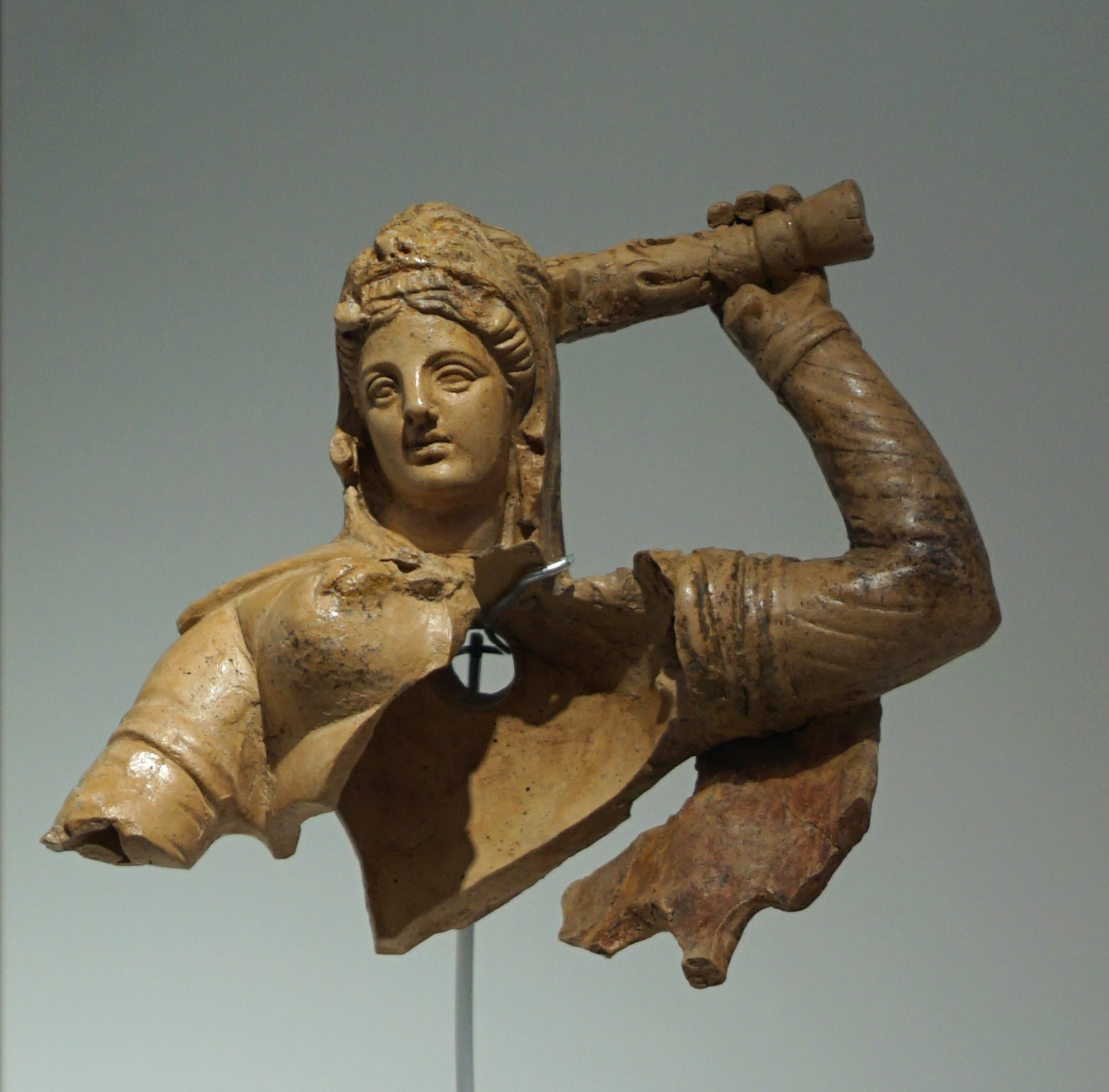
Terracotta figurine of Omphale, Paphos Archaeological Museum, Cyprus.

But according to the historian Xanthus of Lydia (5th century BC) as cited by Nicolaus of Damascus, the Heraclid dynasty of Lydia traced their descent to a son of Heracles and Omphale named Tylon, and were called Tylonidai. It is known from coins that this Tylon was a native Anatolian god equated with the Greek Heracles.

Herodotus asserts that the first of the Heraclids to reign in Sardis was Agron, the son of Ninus, son of Belus, son of Alcaeus, son of Heracles. Later writers know a Ninus who is the primordial king of Assyria, and they often call this Ninus son of Belus. Their Ninus is the legendary founder and eponym of the city of Ninus, referring to Ninevah, while Belus, though sometimes treated as a human, is identified with the god Bel.

An earlier genealogy may have made Agron, as a legendary first king of an ancient dynasty, to be a son of the mythical Ninus, son of Belus, and stopped at that point. In the genealogy given by Herodotus, someone may have grafted the tradition of a Lydian son of Heracles at the top end of it, so that Ninus and Belus in the list now become descendants of Heracles, who just happen to bear the same names as the more famous Ninus and Belus.

That, at least, is the interpretation of later chronologists who also ignored Herodotus' statement that Agron was the first to be a king, and included Alcaeus, Belus, and Ninus in their List of kings of Lydia.

As to how Agron gained the kingdom from the older dynasty descended from Lydus son of Atys, Herodotus only says that the Heraclids, "having been entrusted by these princes with the management of affairs, obtained the kingdom by an oracle."

Strabo (5.2.2) makes Atys father of Lydus, and Tyrrhenus to be one of the descendants of Heracles and Omphale. But all other accounts place Atys, Lydus, and Tyrrhenus brother of Lydus among the pre-Heraclid kings of Lydia.

== In art ==
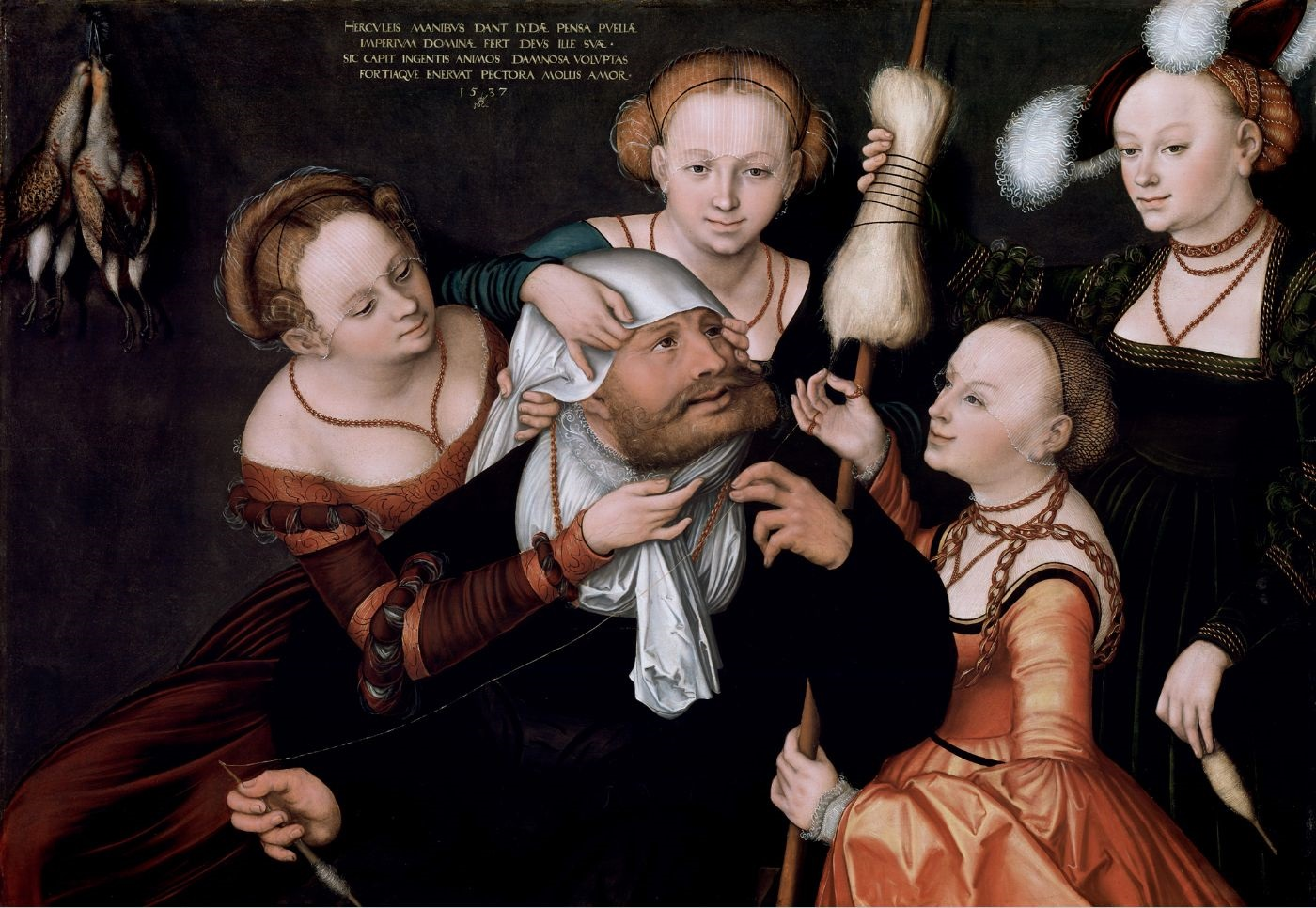
Hercules and Omphale's maids, by Lucas Cranach the Elder

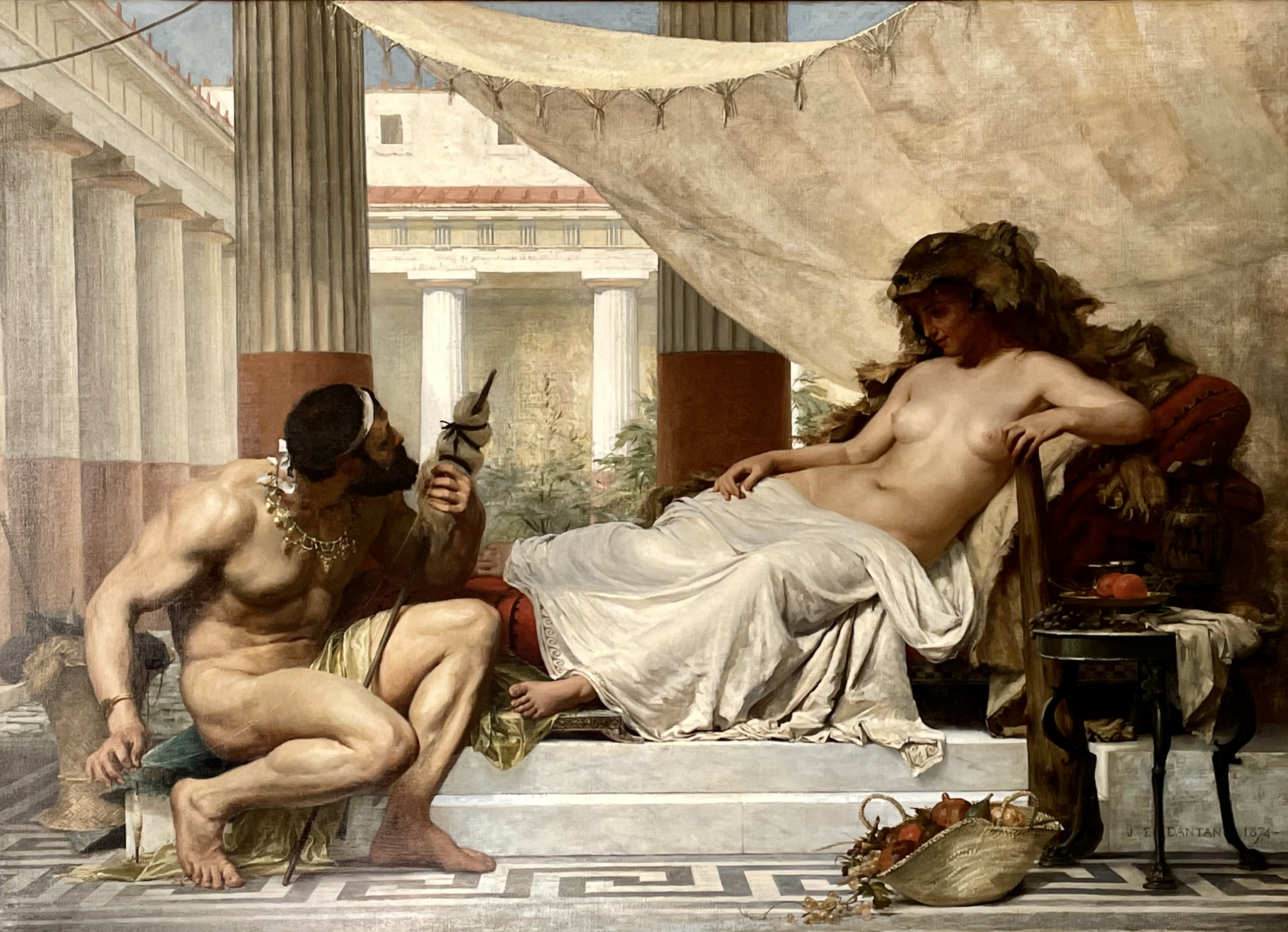
Hercules at the feet of Omphale by Édouard Joseph Dantan

- Omphale is an opera by the French composer André Cardinal Destouches, first performed at the Académie Royale de Musique (the Paris Opera) on 10 November 1701.
- One of the most famous symphonic poems in a mythological series composed by the French composer Camille Saint-Saëns in the 1870s is titled Le Rouet d'Omphale ("The Spinning Wheel of Omphale") the rouet being a spinning wheel that the queen and her maidens used—in this version of the myth, it was Delphic Apollo who condemned the hero to serve the Lydian queen disguised as a woman. In the twentieth century, during the "Golden Age of Radio", this symphonic poem gained wider public exposure when it was used as the theme music for The Shadow.
- Hercules and Omphale or The Power of Love is a "classical extravaganza" which premiered at Royal St. James's Theatre in London on 26 December 1864. Written by William Brough, with music composed and arranged by Wallerstein, the piece was directed by Charles Matthews. Hercules was played en travesti by Charlotte Saunders (possibly Charlotte Cushman Saunders), with a Miss Herbert as Omphale.
- Hercules and Omphale is the subject of several paintings by the sixteenth-century German painter Lucas Cranach the Elder. They feature Hercules being dressed up as a woman by Omphale and her maids. Hercules is also spinning wool.
- Hercules at the feet of Omphale is a painting by the French nineteenth-century painter Édouard Joseph Dantan. Hercules is depicted sitting at the feet of Omphale, spinning wool.
- "Hercule et Omphale" is a short, sexually explicit poem by the French poet Guillaume Apollinaire appearing in the erotic (and for many years forbidden) novel Les onze mille verges (The Eleven Thousand Penises).
- In August Strindberg's The Father (1887), the protagonist, Captain Adolf, likens his wife's mistreatment of him to Omphale's behavior toward Heracles. "Omphale!" He screams. "It's Queen Omphale herself! Now you play with Hercules' club while he spins your wool!"

== In cinema ==
Queen Omphale is a main character of Hercules Unchained, the sequel of Hercules (1958). Her guards capture males who drink from a fountain of forgetfulness one by one. She makes him her love slave, calls him the King, and then has him killed by her guards when they come with the next man. In Hercules's quest to mediate the power struggle between Polynices and Eteocles, he drinks from the fountain and becomes captive to Omphale. His comrade, Ulysses (Odysseus), pretends to be deaf and mute in order to remain imprisoned on the island and stay in contact with Hercules, as opposed to being killed. He sneaks out of his cell one night to find a cave filled with preserved statues of Omphale's previous love slaves. He continues to feed Hercules regular water, which eventually leads to Hercules regaining memory and escaping the island. Omphale ultimately commits suicide by jumping in the preservation bath when Hercules escapes.

== Notes ==
Preceded by Megara	Wives of Heracles	Succeeded by Deianira
