= Ascalus =

Semi-historical general of ancient Lydia

Ascalus (Ancient Greek: Ἄσκαλος) was a son of Hymenaeus and brother to Tantalus (unrelated to the well-known mythological Tantalus), and a general of the Lydian king Aciamus. His brother Tantalus was said to have been a native of Magnesia, so it is reasonable to assume that Ascalus was as well. However, Ascalus was sometimes described -- by Xanthus among others -- alongside other mythical Lydian figures such as king Cambles, so it also seems possible that Ascalus himself may have been more a mythological than historical figure.

Ascalus was said to have fallen in love with a woman who lived on the Mediterranean coast of the southern Levant, and settled there to be close to her, founding the town of Ascalon, an ancient Near East port city that survived until the 13th century.
