= Xenoclea =

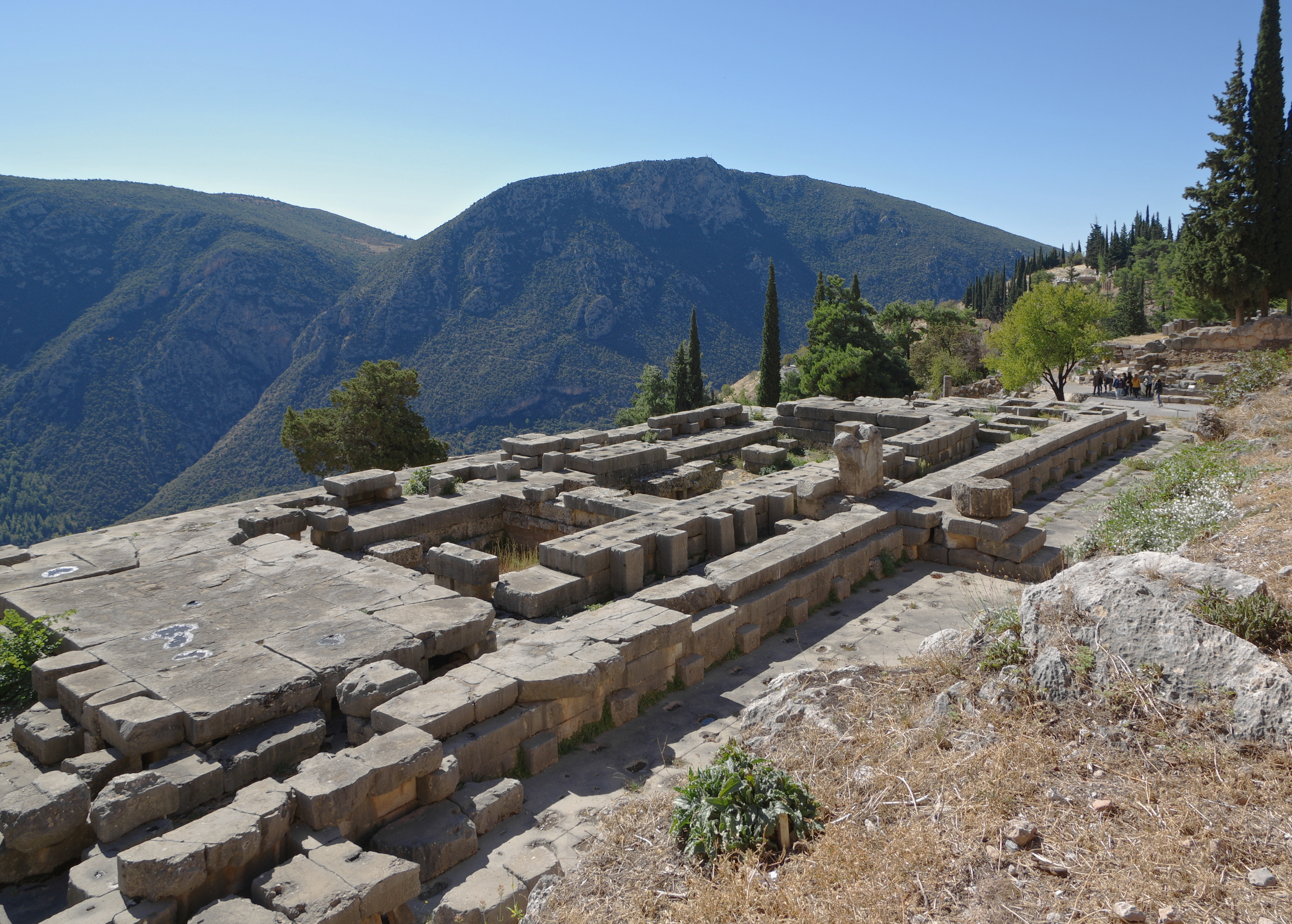
Remains of the Temple of Apollo at Delphi

Xenoclea (Ancient Greek: Ξενόκλεια), who appears as a character in the legend of Hercules, was the Pythia, or priestess and oracle, of the Temple of Apollo at Delphi.

The Delphic oracle was a historical reality and was established in the 8th century BC.

== In legend ==
According to Pausanias and others, Hercules travelled to Delphi to consult the Oracle following the death of Iphitus, whom he had thrown off a wall in the city of Tiryns while Iphitus was staying with him as a guest. Suffering from nightmares, Hercules sought advice as to how to be cured. However, when he came to address his request to Xenoclea, she refused to help him, considering that he was still unpurified from the blood and death of Iphitus and also being shocked by the nature of his crime. Her only answer to him was "You murdered your guest, I have no oracle for such as you". This contemptuous reply so enraged Hercules that he sacrilegiously seized the priestess's Delphic tripod, took it away, and would not return it until she had agreed to grant his own request.

After the return of her tripod, and after bathing in the Castalian Spring, Xenoclea pronounced that Hercules would be purified of the death of Iphitus only by serving a year as a slave, with the price he fetched going to the children of Iphitus as compensation for the loss of their father. Asked who was to buy him, Xenoclea replied that it would be Omphale, Queen of Lydia. Hercules accepted the guidance of the oracle and agreed to serve Omphale for one year.

Ancient depictions of the incident in the temple survive. On one ancient vase, Hercules is shown carrying off the sacred tripod, while Apollo, holding a branch of laurel, struggles to recover it and Xenoclea, apparently terrified by the dispute, looks on from a window, awaiting the outcome.

== In modern fiction ==
In Geraldine McCaughrean's Theseus (2003), Theseus goes to Delphi to ask Xenoclea "why the gods have poured down this plague on us" and for the oracle's guidance on what to do in expiation.

In Ngaio Marsh's Black as He's Painted (1974), a character is named Xenoclea, and when asked "Is it a made up job, then, that name?", Marsh's detective replies "Not by her, at least. Xenoclea was a mythical prophetess who wouldn't do her stuff for Hercules because he hadn't had a bath."
