= Dascylium (Caria) =

Town of ancient Caria

Dascylium or Daskylion (Ancient Greek: Δασκύλιον) or Daskyleion (Δασκυλεῖον) was a town in ancient Caria, mentioned by Stephanus of Byzantium. It was located near the frontiers of Ephesus. It is said to have been named after the mythical Dascylus, son of Periaudes, thus corresponding to Ancient Greek: Δασκύλου κώμη, romanized: Daskylou kome ('village of Dascylus') cited by Pausanias.

Its site is unlocated.
