= Atys of Lydia =

Legendary king of Lydia

Atys (Ancient Greek: Ἄτυς) is a legendary figure of the 2nd millennium BC who is attested by Herodotus to have been an early king of Lydia, then probably known as Maeonia. He was the son of Manes and the father of Lydus, after whom the Lydian people were later named.

Herodotus recounts that Maeonia was beset by severe famine during Atys' reign. To help them endure hunger, the Maeonians developed various expedients including dice, knucklebones and ball games. The idea was that they would eat every other day only. On the interim days when they fasted, they would play games all day to distract their minds from hunger. Herodotus says they lived like that for eighteen years. Eventually, Atys decided to halve the population, one half to remain in Maeonia and the other half to leave and found a colony elsewhere. Lots were drawn and Atys appointed himself to stay while one of his sons, Tyrrhenus, led the colonists to Umbria where they settled and became known as Tyrrhenians.

The native Greco-Lydian historian Xanthus, who wrote in Ionian Greek slightly after Herodotus on the history of Lydia known as Lydiaca (Λυδιακά), though his work survives only in fragments, also affirmed that King Atys was father to two sons, Lydus and Torubus, who he says parted company, splitting the Maeonian nation into two, Lydians and "Torubians".

Atys was claimed by Strabo and to have been a descendant of Heracles and Omphale.

== See also ==
- List of kings of Lydia
