= Dascylium (Aeolis) =

Dascylium or Daskylion (Ancient Greek: Δασκύλιον) or Daskyleion (Δασκυλεῖον) was a town in the border region of ancient Aeolis and ancient Phrygia, mentioned by Stephanus of Byzantium.

Its site is unlocated.
