= Dascylium (Bithynia) =

Town of ancient Bithynia

Coordinates: 40°22′40″N 28°40′27″E

Dascylium or Daskylion (Ancient Greek: Δασκύλιον) or Daskyleion (Δασκυλεῖον) was a town of ancient Bithynia, mentioned by Stephanus of Byzantium.

Its site is located near Eşkel, Asiatic Turkey.

== History ==
In 1399, french king Charles VI, in response to emperor Manuel II's call for help, sent an expeditionary force, led by marshal Jean II le Meingre 'Boucicaut', to defend Constantinople, besieged by ottoman forces. In autumn of that year, the small army, whilst attacking the turkish military apparatus, attacked and burned the medieval town, called Dyaquis.
