= Meles of Lydia =

Biographical record for Meles, a semi-historical king of Lydia

Meles (fl. 8th century BC; also known as Myrsus) was a semi-historical king of Lydia. According to Herodotus, he was the 21st and penultimate king of the Heraclid dynasty and was succeeded by his son, Candaules (died c.687 BC).

== See also ==
- List of kings of Lydia

== Sources ==
- Bury, J. B.; Meiggs, Russell (1975) [first published 1900]. A History of Greece (Fourth ed.). London: MacMillan Press. ISBN 0-333-15492-4.
- Herodotus (1975) [first published 1954]. Burn, A. R.; de Sélincourt, Aubrey (eds.). The Histories. London: Penguin Books. ISBN 0-14-051260-8.

Preceded by unknown	King of Lydia; 8th century BC	Succeeded by Candaules
