= Ring of Gyges =

Mythical magical artifact in Plato's Republic

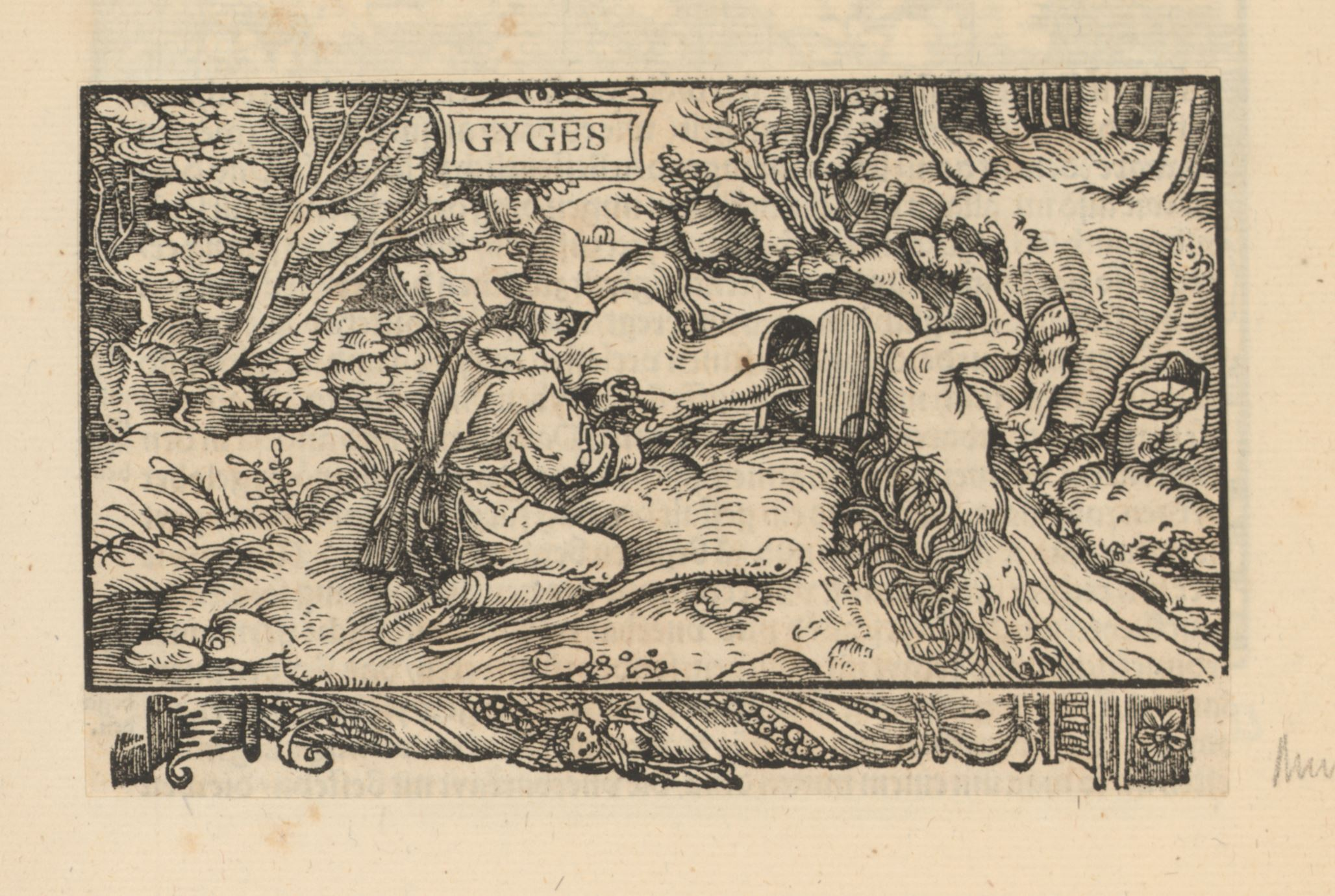
Depiction of Gyges discovering the ring, after Hans Weiditz, 16th century

The Ring of Gyges /ˈdʒaɪˌdʒiːz/ (Ancient Greek: Γύγου δακτύλιος, Gúgou daktúlios, Attic Greek pronunciation: [ˈɡyːˌɡuː dakˈtylios]) is a hypothetical magic ring mentioned by the philosopher Plato in Book 2 of his Republic (2:359a–2:360d). It grants its owner the power to become invisible at will. Using the ring as an example, this section of the Republic considers whether a rational, intelligent person who has no need to fear negative consequences for committing an injustice would nevertheless act justly.

== The legends ==
Gyges of Lydia was a historical king, the founder of the Mermnad dynasty of Lydian kings. Various ancient works—the most well-known being The Histories of Herodotus—gave different accounts of the circumstances of his acquisition of power. All, however, agree in asserting that he was originally a subordinate of King Candaules of Lydia, that he killed Candaules and seized the throne, and that he had either seduced Candaules' Queen before killing him, married her afterwards, or both.

In the recounting of the myth by Glaucon (Plato's older brother, as a character of the Republic), an unnamed ancestor of Gyges was a shepherd in the service of the king of Lydia. After an earthquake, a chasm was revealed in a mountainside where he was feeding his flock. Entering the chasm, he discovered that it was in fact a tomb with a bronze horse containing a corpse, larger than that of a man, who wore a golden ring, which he then pocketed. He discovered that by adjusting the ring, he gained the power of invisibility. He then arranged to become one of the king's messengers as to the status of the flocks. Arriving at the palace, he used his new power of invisibility to seduce the queen, and with her help, murder the king, and become king of Lydia himself.

== The role of the legend in Plato's Republic ==
In the Republic, the tale of the ring of Gyges is described by the character of Glaucon, the brother of Plato. Glaucon asks whether any man could be so virtuous that he may resist the temptation of killing, robbing, raping, or generally doing injustice to whomever he pleased if he could do so remaining undetected. Glaucon wants Socrates to argue that it is beneficial for us to be just, independent of any consideration for our reputation.

Glaucon posits:

Suppose now that there were two such magic rings, and the just put on one of them and the unjust the other; no man can be imagined to be of such an iron nature that he would stand fast in justice. No man would keep his hands off what was not his own when he could safely take what he liked out of the market, or go into houses and lie with any one at his pleasure, or kill or release from prison whom he would, and in all respects be like a god among men.

Then the actions of the just would be as the actions of the unjust; they would both come at last to the same point. And this we may truly affirm to be a great proof that a man is just, not willingly or because he thinks that justice is any good to him individually, but of necessity, for wherever any one thinks that he can safely be unjust, there he is unjust.

For all men believe in their hearts that injustice is far more profitable to the individual than justice, and he who argues as I have been supposing, will say that they are right. If you could imagine any one obtaining this power of becoming invisible, and never doing any wrong or touching what was another's, he would be thought by the lookers-on to be a most wretched idiot, although they would praise him to one another's faces, and keep up appearances with one another from a fear that they too might suffer injustice.

— Plato, Republic, 360b–d (Jowett trans.)

Though his answer to Glaucon's challenge is delayed, Socrates argues ultimately that justice does not derive from this social construct: the man who abused the power of the Ring of Gyges has in fact enslaved himself to his appetites, while the man who chose not to use it remains rationally in control of himself and is therefore happy (Republic 10:612b).

== Cultural influences ==
- Cicero retells the story of Gyges in De Officiis to illustrate his thesis that a wise or good individual bases decisions on a fear of moral degradation as opposed to punishment or negative consequences. Cicero follows with a discussion of the role of thought experiments in philosophy. The hypothetical situation in question is complete immunity from punishment of the kind afforded to Gyges by his ring.
- J.R.R. Tolkien was familiar with Plato's myth and had possibly read part of the story's original text in Ancient Greek; the fable influenced his own writing on The Lord of the Rings.
- The myth is referenced in chapter 34 of Alexandre Dumas’s The Count of Monte Cristo.

== See also ==
- Helm of Hades
