= Dascylium (southern Caria) =

Town in ancient Caria

Dascylium or Daskylion (Ancient Greek: Δασκύλιον) or Daskyleion (Δασκυλεῖον) was a town in ancient Caria, mentioned by Stephanus of Byzantium. Stephanus relates that it was founded after the Trojan War.

Its site is unlocated.
