= Dascylium (Ionia) =

Dascylium or Daskylion (Ancient Greek: Δασκύλιον) or Daskyleion (Δασκυλεῖον) was a town of ancient Ionia, mentioned by Stephanus of Byzantium. Stephanus calls it τὸ μέγα (the large) to distinguish it from the other towns of this name he cites.

Its site is unlocated.
