= Iardanus (father of Omphale) =

Biographical record of Iardanus, legendary king of Lydia

In Greek mythology, Iardanus or Iardanos (Ancient Greek: Ἰάρδανος), also called Iardanes (Ancient Greek: Ἰαρδάνης), was a king of Lydia, and the father of Omphale, the Lydian queen who for a time owned Heracles as her slave. This is perhaps the same Iardanus which Herodotus refers to when he says that the Heracleidae were descendants of Heracles and "a female slave of Iardanus" (Omphale?).
