= Dascylus =

In Greek mythology, Dascylus or Daskylos (Ancient Greek: Δάσκυλος) is a name that may refer to:

- Dascylus, a king who ruled over Mysia or Mariandyne. He is presumably the eponym of the coastal city of Dascylaeum or Dascylium (but see below). The wife of Dascylus was Anthemoeisia, daughter of the river god Lycus, and he was the father of sons named Lycus, Priolas, and Otreus. Dascylus' own father was the infamous Tantalus. Priolas and Otreus were both killed by Amycus, king of Bebrycia (Bithynia); Otreus was killed while travelling to Troy to sue for the hand of King Laomedon's daughter Hesione in marriage. Both sons have names connected with local settlements: Priola, near Heraclea, and Otrea, on the Ascanian Lake.
- Dascylus, a son of Lycus, and grandson of the above Dascylus. He acted as a guide to the Argonauts.
- Dascylus of Lydia (fl. late 8th to early 7th century BC), named by Herodotus as the father of Gyges.
- Dascylus, father of Nacolus. His son was the eponym of the city of Nacoleia in Phrygia.
- Dascylus, son of Periaudes, eponym of Dascylium, a town in Caria.
