= Lydus =

Legendary king of Lydia

Lydus (Ancient Greek: Λυδός), a son of Atys and Callithea, grandson of Manes, and brother of Tyrrhenus or Torybus, is a legendary figure of the 2nd millennium BC who is attested by Herodotus to have been an early king of Lydia, then probably known as Maeonia. According to Herodotus, the country of Lydia and its people were afterwards named for Lydus, their mythical ancestor.

== Sources ==
- Herodotus, I. 7, 94.
- Dionysius of Halicarnassus, I. 27, &c.
- Strabo, v. p. 219.

== Bibliography ==
- "Lydus (1)", William Smith (ed.). Dictionary of Greek and Roman Biography and Mythology. 2. Boston: Little, Brown & Co., 1867.

== See also ==
- List of kings of Lydia
