= Candaules =

King of Lydia (died c. 687 BC)

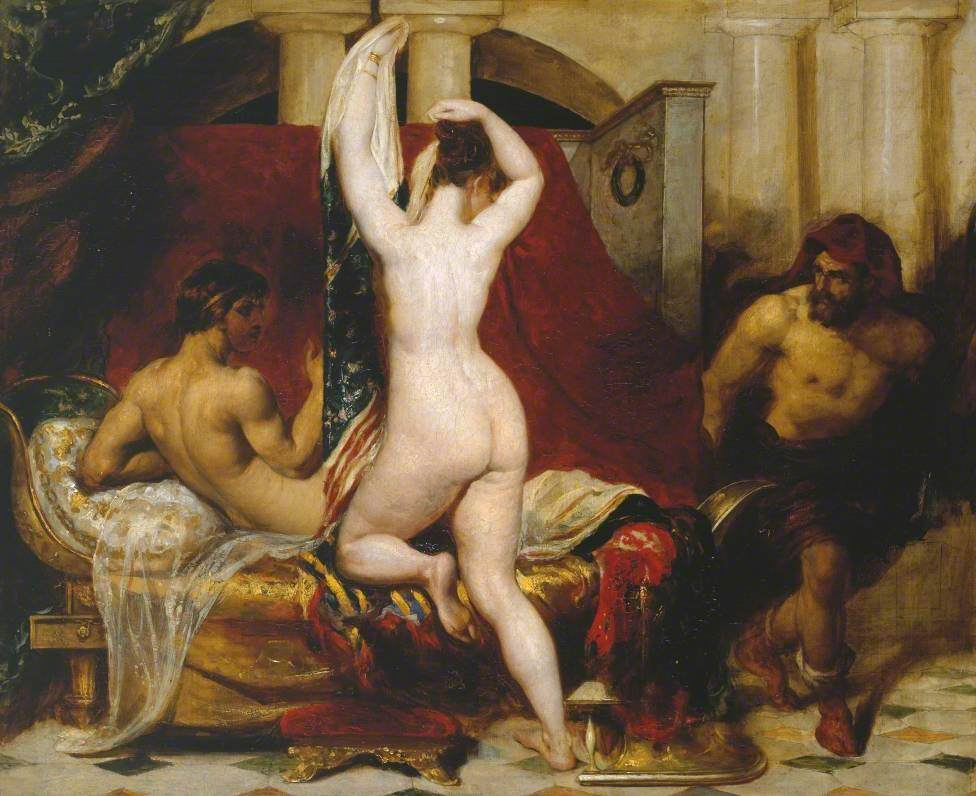
Candaules, King of Lydia, Shews his Wife by Stealth to Gyges, One of his Ministers, as She Goes to Bed by William Etty. This image illustrates Herodotus' tale of Candaules and Gyges.

Candaules (died c.687 BC; Greek: Κανδαύλης, Kandaulēs), also known as Myrsilos (Μυρσίλος), was a king of the ancient Kingdom of Lydia in the early years of the 7th century BC. According to Herodotus, he succeeded his father Meles as the 22nd and last king of Lydia's Heraclid dynasty. He was assassinated and succeeded by Gyges.

Based on an ambiguous line in the work of the Greek poet Hipponax, it was traditionally assumed that the name Candaules meant "hound-choker" among the Lydians. J. B. Bury and Russell Meiggs (1975) say that Candaules is a Maeonian name meaning "hound-choker". More recently, however, it has been suggested that the name or title Kandaules is cognate with the Luwian hantawatt(i)– ("king") and probably has Carian origin. The name or title of Candaules is the origin of the term candaulism, a sexual practice which legend attributed to him.

Several stories of how the Heraclid dynasty of Candaules ended and the Mermnad dynasty of Gyges began have been related by different authors throughout history, mostly in a mythical vein. In Plato's Republic, Gyges used a magical ring to become invisible and usurp the throne, a plot device which has reappeared in numerous myths and works of fiction throughout history. The earliest story, related by Herodotus in the 5th century BC, has Candaules betrayed and executed by his wife.

== Herodotus's tale of King Candaules, Gyges and the queen ==
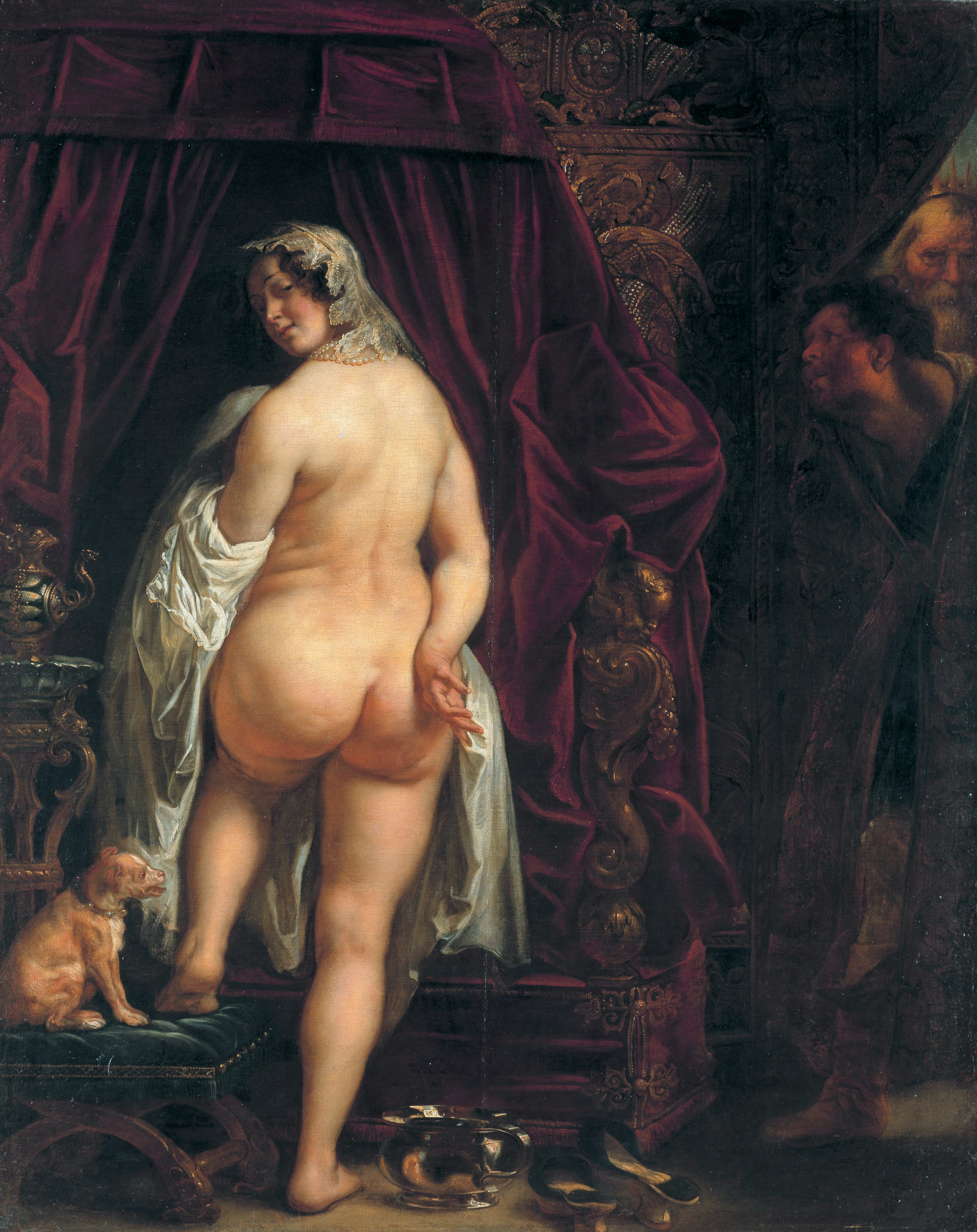
Candaules Showing His Wife to Gyges by Jacob Jordaens, 1646

According to Herodotus in The Histories, Candaules believed his wife to be the most beautiful woman on Earth. Herodotus does not name the queen but later artists and writers have called her Nyssia.

Candaules often told his favourite bodyguard, Gyges, how beautiful the queen was and, thinking Gyges did not believe him, urged Gyges to contrive to see her naked. Gyges initially refused as he did not wish to dishonor the queen. Nevertheless, Candaules was insistent and Gyges had no option but to obey his king. So Gyges hid in Candaules' bedroom and, when the queen entered, watched her undress. As she was getting into bed, he quietly left the room, but the queen saw him and realised what had happened. Herodotus commented: "For with the Lydians, as with most barbarian (i.e., non-Greek) races, it is thought highly indecent even for a man to be seen naked".

The queen silently swore revenge for her shame. Next day, she summoned Gyges to her chamber. Gyges thought it was a routine request, but she confronted him immediately and presented him with two choices. One was to kill Candaules and seize the throne with Nyssia as his wife. The second was to be executed immediately by her trusted servants. Gyges pleaded with her to relent but she would not. He decided to take the first course of action and assassinate the king. The plan was that he should hide in the royal bedroom as before but this time from the king. After Candaules fell asleep, Gyges crept forward and stabbed him to death.

Gyges married the queen as she had insisted but many Lydians did not at first accept him as their ruler. In order to prevent a civil war, Gyges offered to have his position confirmed or refused by the Delphic Oracle. He agreed that he would restore the throne to the Heracleidae if the Oracle declared against him. The Oracle supported him and his dynasty was established. The Priestess of the Shrine did add, however, that the Heraclids would have their revenge on Gyges in the fifth generation of the Mermnadae.

=== Modern view of the story ===
The story is rejected by Bury and Meiggs, who assert that the family of Candaules, although descended from Heracles himself, had become degenerate. As a result, Candaules was assassinated c. 687 BC by Gyges, who ushered in a new era for Lydia ruled by his own Mermnadae clan.

Herodotus's version is included in Michael Ondaatje's 1992 novel The English Patient. The story also figures prominently in Anthony Powell's 1973 novel Temporary Kings, the eleventh volume in the series A Dance to the Music of Time, in which characters discuss a fictitious portrayal of Candaules and Gyges by Tiepolo.

Alexander von Zemlinsky's opera Der König Kandaules is based on the play Le roi Candaule by André Gide.

== See also ==
- List of kings of Lydia

== Sources ==
- Bury, J. B.; Meiggs, Russell (1975) [first published 1900]. A History of Greece (Fourth ed.). London: MacMillan Press. ISBN 0-333-15492-4.
- Herodotus (1975) [first published 1954]. Burn, A. R.; de Sélincourt, Aubrey (eds.). The Histories. London: Penguin Books. ISBN 0-14-051260-8.
- Plato (1987) [first published 1955]. Lee, Desmond (ed.). The Republic. London: Penguin Books. ISBN 0-14-044048-8.
- von Krafft-Ebing, Richard (1886). Psychopathia sexualis. Eine klinisch-forensische Studie. Stuttgart: Enke.
- Strassler, Robert B. The Landmark Herodotus: The Histories. Anchor Books, 2009.

Preceded by Meles	King of Lydia ?–c.687 BC	Succeeded by Gyges
