= Gyges of Lydia =

King of Lydia (fl. 7th century BC)

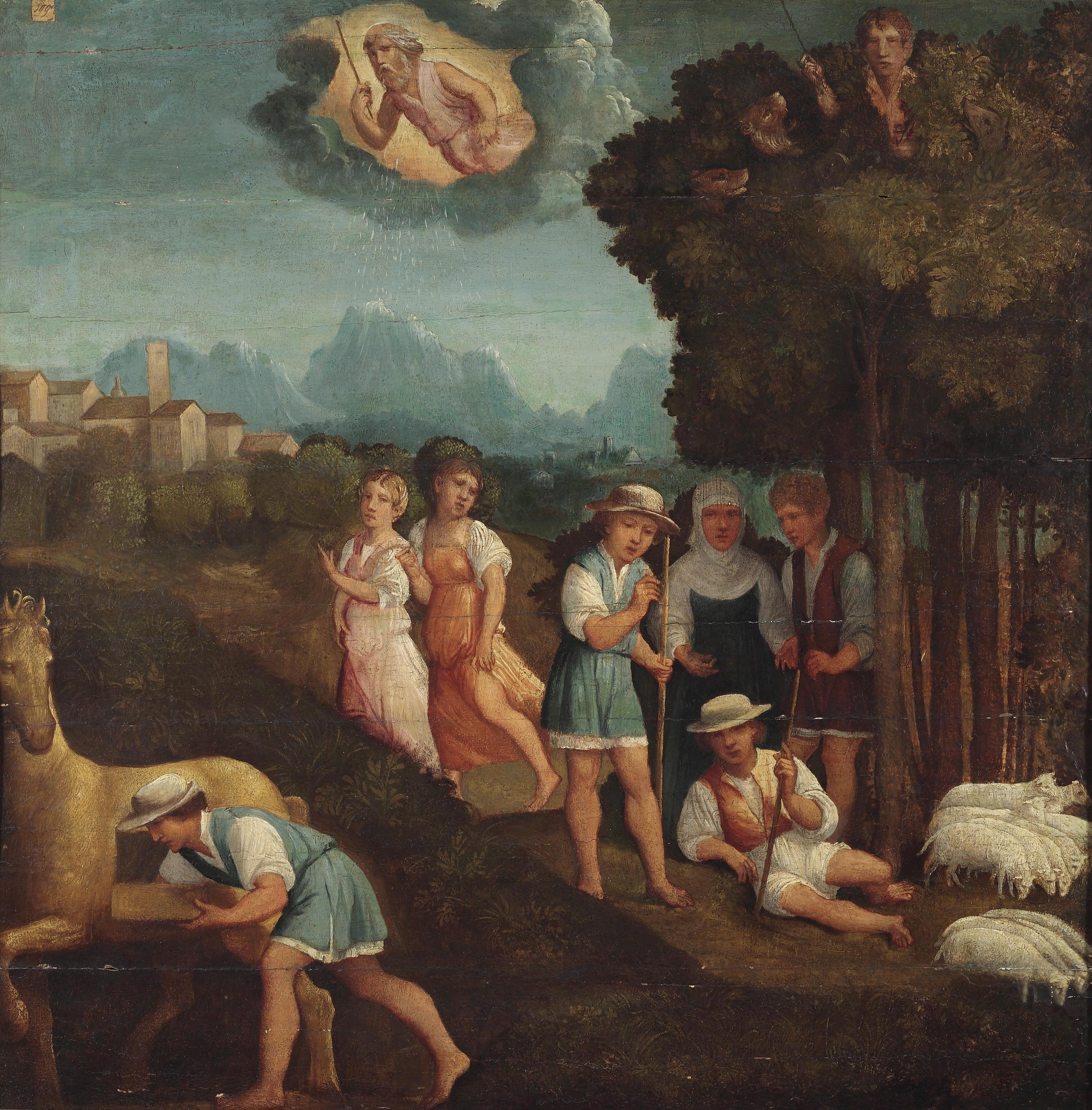
- A rare depiction of the legend of Gyges finding the magic ring, Ferrara, 16th century

King of Lydia
- Reign: c. 680-644 BC
- Predecessor: Candaules
- Successor: Ardys
- Died: 644 BC
- Issue: Ardys
- Lydian: 𐤨𐤰𐤨𐤠𐤮 (Kukas)
- Dynasty: Mermnad dynasty
- Father: Dascylus

Gyges (Note: Phonetically:/ˈdʒaɪdʒiːz/, /ˈɡaɪdʒiːz/; Lydian: 𐤨𐤰𐤨𐤠𐤮, romanized: Kukas; Neo-Assyrian Akkadian: 𒁹𒄖𒊌𒄖, 𒁹𒄖𒄖, romanized: Gugu; Ancient Greek: Γύγης, romanized: Gugēs; Latin: Gygēs) (reigned c. 680–644 BC) was the founder of the Mermnad dynasty of Lydian kings and the first known king of the Lydian kingdom to have attempted to transform it into a powerful empire. Gyges reigned 38 years according to Herodotus.

== Attestations and etymology ==
The name Gyges is derived from the Ancient Greek form Gugēs (Ancient Greek: Γύγης) recorded by Graeco-Roman authors. In addition, the annals of the Assyrian king Ashurbanipal refer several times to Gu(g)gu, king of Luddi, to be identified with Gyges, king of the Lydians.

Gu(g)gu and Gugēs are respectively the Akkadian and Greek forms of the Lydian name Kukas (𐤨𐤰𐤨𐤠𐤮), which means "grandfather". Kukas is derived from a common Proto-Indo-European root from which evolved Hittite ḫuḫḫa- (𒄷𒄴𒄩), Luwian ḫūḫa- (𒄷𒌋𒄩) and huha- (𔕳𔓷), and Lycian xuga- (𐊜𐊒𐊄𐊀) in the Anatolian languages family, as well as Latin avus, all meaning "grandfather".

Another derivation for Kukas suggests that it might be a loanword from Carian Quq (𐊨𐊲𐊨), which was represented in Greek as Gugos (Γυγος), and was a cognate of the various Anatolian words for "grandfather": Hittite ḫuḫḫa (𒄷𒄴𒄩), Luwian ḫūḫa- (𒄷𒌋𒄩) and huha- (𔕳𔓷), Milyan xuga- (𐊜𐊒𐊄𐊀), and Lycian xuga- (𐊜𐊒𐊄𐊀). If this etymology is accurate, it correlates with the probability of a Carian origin of the Mermnad dynasty.

Attestations of Gyges's name from the period of the Lydian kingdom are found on the legends of coins by his great-grandson Alyattes, reading Kukalim (𐤨𐤰𐤨𐤠𐤩𐤦𐤪), meaning "I am of Kukas".

== Life, reign and death ==
Nothing is known about Gyges's origins except for the Greek historian Herodotus's claim that he was the son of a man named Dascylus.

=== Rise to power ===
Available historical evidence suggests that Gyges became the king of Lydia by overthrowing his predecessor, King Candaules of the Heraclid dynasty. Gyges was helped in his coup by a Carian prince from Mylasa named Arselis, suggesting that Gyges's Mermnad dynasty might have had good relations with Carian aristocrats, as they provided armed support in his rebellion. Gyges's rise to power happened during a period of turmoil following the invasion of the Cimmerians, a nomadic people from the Eurasian Steppe who had invaded Western Asia, who around 675 BC destroyed the previous major power in Anatolia, the kingdom of Phrygia.

Immediately after Gyges seized the Lydian throne, the oracle of the god Apollo at Delphi confirmed the legitimacy of his kingship. To thank the oracle, Gyges made lavish offerings of gold and silver. These offerings remained at Delphi in the time of Herodotus, who referred to Gyges's dedications as the Gygadas (Ancient Greek: Γυγαδας Gugadas) and remarked that most of the silver at Delphi was part of it. The most notable of these offerings were six crates made of gold which collectively weighed thirty talents.

=== Wars against the Ionians ===
Gyges took advantage of the power vacuum created by the Cimmerian invasions to consolidate his kingdom and make it a military power, and, to this end, immediately after coming to power he attacked the Ionian Greek cities of Miletus, Smyrna, and Colophon. Gyges was, however, unable to conquer Miletus, and he made peace with the city, following which Gyges accorded to the Milesians the privilege of colonizing the coastal areas of Asia Minor under Lydian control. Gyges's attempt to capture Smyrna likewise failed; the inhabitants of the city were able to repel his attacks. After this, peaceful and friendly relations were established between them. Thereafter, the Lydians used the port of Smyrna to export their products and import grain, and Lydian craftsmen worked in Smyrnian workshops. These close ties ended when Gyges's great-grandson, Alyattes, conquered Smyrna around 600 BC. Gyges's attack on Colophon enabled him to seize control of its lower city only, and Colophon soon regained its independence and would not be subject to Lydian rule again until Alyattes conquered it.

=== Alliance with the Carians ===
To the south, Gyges continued maintaining alliances with the dynasts of the various city-states of the Carians, which required the Lydian and Carian rulers to support each other, and his successors would continue to maintain these alliances and solidify them through marriage. These connections ensured that the Lydians were able to control Caria through alliances with Carian dynasts ruling over fortified settlements, such as Mylasa and Pedasa, and through Lydian aristocrats settled in Carian cities, such as Aphrodisias. In addition to diplomatic ties, the Lydians also shared strong cultural connections with the Carians, such as sharing the sanctuary of the god Zeus of Mylasa with the Carians and the Mysians because they believed these three peoples descended from three brothers.

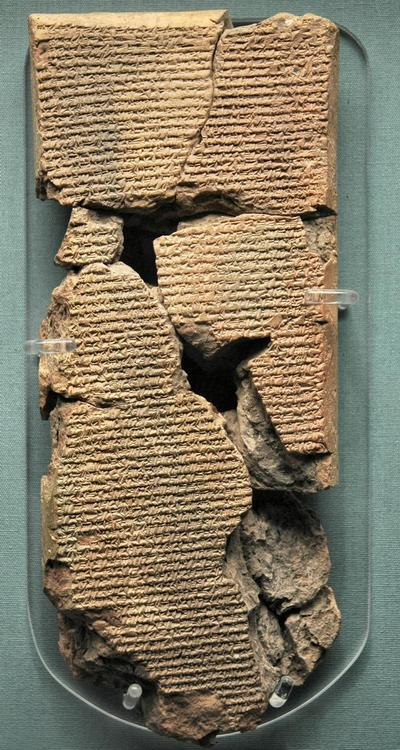
Gyges tablet, British Museum

Gyges entertained better relations with the leading Aeolian Greek city of Cyme, which had already established friendly relations with Lydia during the preceding Heraclid dynasty, and with the Ionian Greek city of Ephesus, whose tyrant, Melas the Elder, married one of the daughters of Gyges. These ties with Ephesus would be renewed by Gyges's son Ardys through the marriage of his daughter Lyde with Melas's grandson Miletus, and by Gyges's great-grandson Alyattes, who married one of his daughters to the Ephesian tyrant Melas the Younger, himself a descendant of both Melas the Elder and of Miletus. These cordial relations between Lydia and Ephesus would continue until they were broken by Gyges's great-great-grandson Croesus.

=== Wars with the Cimmerians ===
In 665 BC, Gyges was faced with a war with the Cimmerians. Around the same time, according to Neo-Assyrian records, Gyges had a dream in which the Assyrian god Aššur appeared to him and told him to seek help from Ashurbanipal and send him tribute. Gyges contacted the Neo-Assyrian court by sending diplomats to Nineveh, but offered him presents only, not tribute, and therefore refused to become a vassal of Assyria. Gyges soon defeated the Cimmerian invaders without Assyrian help, and he sent to Nineveh Cimmerian soldiers captured while ravaging Lydian lands.

=== Conquests ===
After having repelled the Cimmerians, and with the leading Aeolian Greek city of Cyme already having good relations with Lydia, Gyges took advantage of the power vacuum caused by the destruction of the Phrygian kingdom by the Cimmerians to conquer the Troad region in northern Anatolia without facing much resistance, following which he installed Lydian settlers in the region and created a hunting reserve in Cyzicus. Under Lydian rule, the city of Ilium acquired an important position and became a local administrative centre from which the Lydians exerted their power over the whole Aegean coast of the Troad as well as the coast of the Hellespont where was located the cities of Achilleion, Abydos, and Neandreia. Furthermore, the Lydian rulers built connections with Illium so they could make profits out of the gold mines of Astyra. The southern part of the Troad, where were located Gargara, Antandrus, Assos, and Lamponeia to the south of Mount Ida and on the shore of the Edremit Gulf, was administered from Adrymettium. In accordance with the monopoly of establishing colonies on lands ruled by the Lydians which Gyges had granted to Miletus, Greek settlers from that city founded the colony of Abydus.

=== Sending mercenaries to Egypt ===
Gyges's extensive alliances with the Carian dynasts allowed him to recruit Carian and Ionian Greek soldiers to send overseas to assist the Egyptian king Psamtik I of the city of Sais, with whom he had established contact around 662 BC. With the help of these armed forces, Psamtik I united Egypt under his rule after eliminating the eleven other kinglets with whom he had been co-ruling Lower Egypt following Esarhaddon's and Ashurbanipal's invasions.

Interpretations of these actions as an alliance between Lydia and Sais against Assyria, however, are inaccurate; Psamtik I's military activities were directed solely against the other local kinglets of Lower Egypt and not against Assyria, although Ashurbanipal disapproved of Psamtik I's actions since he knew he needed these kinglets' support to maintain Assyrian power in Egypt. Moreover, not only had the Assyrians raised Sais to preeminence in Egypt after expelling the Saites' Kushite enemies from the country, but the two kings had signed a treaty with each other, and no hostilities between them are recorded. Thus, Psamtik I and Ashurbanipal had remained allies since the former had been put in power with Assyrian military support. Furthermore, the silence of Assyrian sources concerning Psamtik I's expansion implies there was no hostility, whether overt or covert, between Assyria and Sais during Psamtik I's unification of Egypt under his rule.

Likewise, Gyges's military support of Psamtik I was not directed against Assyria and is not mentioned as hostile to Assyria or allied with other countries against Assyria in Assyrian records; the Assyrian disapproval of Gyges's support for Psamtik I was primarily motivated by Gyges's refusal to ally with Assyria and his undertaking of these actions independently of Assyria, which the Assyrians interpreted as an act of arrogance, rather than by the support itself.

Gyges's military support to Psamtik I lasted until 658 BC, at which point he faced an impending Cimmerian invasion. The Cimmerians invaded Lydia again in 657 BC, though not much is known about this attack except that Gyges survived it. This event is recorded in the Assyrian oracular reports, where it is called a "bad omen" for the "Westland", that is, for Lydia.

=== Death ===
In 644 BC, Lydia faced a third attack by the Cimmerians, led by their king Lygdamis. This time, the Lydians were defeated, Sardis was sacked, and Gyges was killed. Assyrian records blamed Gyges's defeat and death on his decision to act independently from Assyria by sending troops to Psamtik I, and his ending of diplomacy with Assyria, which the Assyrians interpreted as an act of arrogance. He was succeeded by his son Ardys, who resumed diplomatic relations with Assyria and also had to face the Cimmerians.

=== Legacy ===
Gyges's name was later used on the legends of coins by his great-grandson Alyattes, which read Kukalim (𐤨𐤰𐤨𐤠𐤩𐤦𐤪), meaning "I am of Kukas." Some of these coins have a legend Walwet (𐤥𐤠𐤩𐤥𐤤𐤯), which is the abbreviation of the Lydian name of Alyattes, Walwetes (𐤥𐤠𐤩𐤥𐤤𐤯𐤤𐤮), on one side and on the other side have the legend Kukalim, which in this context meant "I am the son/descendant of Kukas" by which Alyattes was declaring his belonging to the dynasty of Gyges.

== Mythical Gyges ==
Like many kings of early antiquity, including Midas of Phrygia and even the better historically documented Alexander the Great, Gyges was subject to mythologizing. The motives for such stories are many; one possibility is that the myths embodied religious beliefs or practices.

=== Allegorical accounts of Gyges' rise to power ===
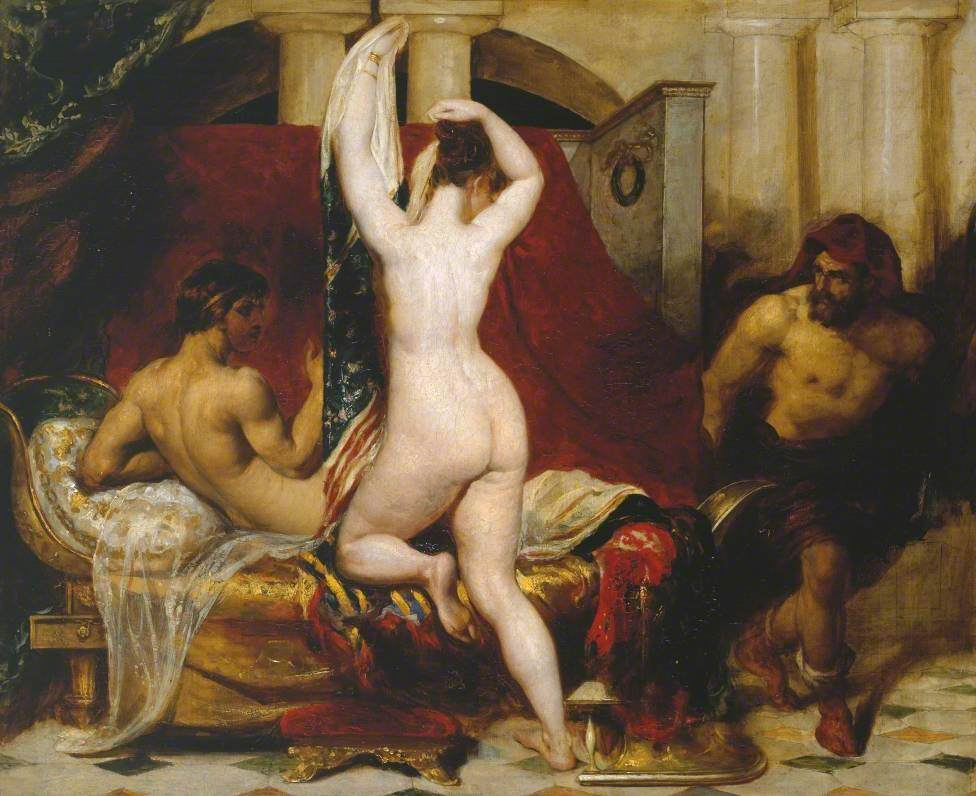
Candaules, King of Lydia, Shews his Wife by Stealth to Gyges, One of his Ministers, as She Goes to Bed by William Etty. This image illustrates Herodotus's version of the tale of Gyges. As told by Herodotus, Gyges watched the naked queen secretly, but was seen by her as he was sneaking out of concealment. An earlier artistic treatment of the same subject, by Dosso Dossi, is now in the Galleria Borghese .

Authors throughout ancient history have told differing stories of Gyges's rise to power, which considerably vary in detail, but virtually all involve him seizing the throne after killing the king, Candaules, and marrying Candaules' widow.

The main source for Gyges is Herodotus, whose account may be traced to the poet Archilochus of Paros. In this, Gyges was a bodyguard of Candaules, who believed his wife to be the most beautiful woman on Earth. He insisted upon Gyges seeing his wife disrobed, and the betrayal so enraged her that she afterwards gave Gyges the choice of murdering her husband and making himself king or being put to death himself.

Herodotus goes on to record how Gyges plied the Oracle of Delphi with numerous gifts, notably six mixing bowls minted of gold extracted from the Pactolus river weighing thirty talents. The Oracle confirmed Gyges as the rightful king of Lydia and gave moral support to the Lydians in their conflict with the Ionians. The priestess nevertheless declared that the dynasty of Gyges would fall in the fifth generation. This prediction was later fulfilled when Gyges's fourth descendant, Croesus, lost the kingdom as a result of attacking the Achaemenid Empire of Cyrus the Great.

In Plato's Republic, Gyges was a shepherd who discovered a magic ring of invisibility, by means of which he murdered the king and won the affection of the queen.

Nicolaus of Damascus supplies his own version of the story that is quite different from both Herodotus and Plato. It involves a multi-generational curse by an old King Ardys of Lydia, because his trusted advisor Dascylus was murdered by Ardys’ son named Sadyattes (or Adyattes). This Sadyattes was envious of Dascylus's growing power. The murderers were never discovered, so King Ardys issued a curse upon them. Dascylus's wife, being then pregnant, escapes to Phrygia (her home), and gives birth to a son, also named Dascylus. Later, Dascylus has a son, Gyges, who, as a young man, arrives in Lydia and is recognized by the king for his outstanding abilities. He is appointed to the royal bodyguard. Gyges soon became a favourite of Candaules and was dispatched by him to fetch Tudo, the daughter of Arnossus of Mysia, whom the Lydian king wished to make his queen. On the way, Gyges fell in love with Tudo, who complained to Sadyates of his conduct. Forewarned that the king intended to kill him, Gyges assassinated Candaules in the night and seized the throne.

According to Plutarch, Gyges seized power with the help of Arselis of Mylasa, the captain of the Lydian bodyguard, whom he won over to his cause.

=== Other legends about Gyges ===
In the second book of Plato's philosophical work The Republic, Glaucon recounts the story of the Ring of Gyges to Socrates, using it to illustrate a point about human nature. Some scholars have suggested that Plato's story was based on a now-lost older version of the myth, while others argue that Plato invented it himself, using elements from Herodotus's story of Gyges. It tells of a man named Gyges who lived in Lydia, an area in modern Turkey. He is a shepherd for the king of that land. One day, there is an earthquake while Gyges is out in the fields, and he notices that a new cave has opened up in a rock face. When he goes in to see what is there, he notices a gold ring on the finger of a former giant king buried in the cave, in an iron horse with a window in its side. He takes the ring and soon discovers that it enables the wearer to become invisible. The next time he goes to the palace to give the king a report about his sheep, he puts the ring on, seduces the queen, kills the king, and takes control of the palace.

In The Republic, Glaucon argues that men are inherently unjust and are only restrained from unjust behaviour by the fetters of law and society. In Glaucon's view, unlimited power blurs the difference between just and unjust men. He tells Socrates:

Suppose there were two such magic rings, and the just [man] put on one of them and the unjust the other; no man can be imagined to be of such an iron nature that he would stand fast in justice. No man would keep his hands off what was not his own when he could safely take what he liked out of the market or go into houses and lie with anyone at his pleasure, or kill or release from prison whom he would, and in all respects be like a god among men. Then the actions of the just would be as the actions of the unjust; they would both come at last to the same point.

Socrates concludes, however, that a truly just man is not a slave to his appetites, so that the opportunities afforded by the ring would not tempt him to abandon his principles.

Many Bible scholars believe that Gyges of Lydia is the Biblical Gog, ruler of Magog, who is mentioned in the Book of Ezekiel and the Book of Revelation.

== Influence on modern works ==
- Théophile Gautier wrote a story entitled "Le roi Candaule" (published in 1844), which was translated by Lafcadio Hearn.
- "Tsar Kandavl" or "Le Roi Candaule" is a grand ballet with choreography by Marius Petipa, and music by Cesare Pugni, with a libretto by Jules-Henri Vernoy de Saint-Georges, based on the Herodotus version. It was first presented by the Imperial Ballet in St. Petersburg, Russia, in 1868, with Henriette D'or as Queen Nisia, Felix Kschessinsky as King Candaules/Tsar Candavl, Lev Ivanov as Gyges and Klavdia Kantsyreva as Claytia.
- "Le Roi Candaule" is also the title of a comedy by Henri Meilhac and Ludovic Halévy, loosely based on the ancient tale and presenting light sketches of Parisian life in the 1860s and 1870s.
- German playwright Friedrich Hebbel's 1856 tragedy Gyges und sein Ring ("Gyges and his Ring").
- In the novel Temporary Kings, penultimate in Anthony Powell's 12-volume A Dance to the Music of Time, Candaules' exhibiting of his naked wife to Gyges and her discovery of it feature on a ceiling painting, attributed to Tiepolo, in a Venetian palace. The story counterpoints themes of voyeurism and death in Powell's narrative.
- In the novel The English Patient, and the film based on it, Count Almásy (himself a disciple of Herodotus) falls in love with a married woman (Katherine Clifton) as she tells Herodotus' version of the Gyges story around a campfire. The story is a harbinger of their own tragic path.
- In the novel Hyperion by Dan Simmons, one of the four evil constructs created by the Core and named by Councillor Albedo is called Gyges.
- One of the chapters in Robertson Davies' novel Fifth Business is called "Gyges and King Candaules". The protagonist, scholar Dunstan Ramsay, his lifelong "friend and enemy", the tycoon Percy "Boy" Staunton, and Staunton's wife Leola, who had been Ramsay's childhood sweetheart, are throughout the book compared with, respectively, Gyges, King Candaules and the Queen of Lydia. In particular, in one scene where Staunton insists upon showing Ramsay nude photos of his wife, Ramsay tells him the ancient story as a warning (which Staunton ignores).
- In 1990 Frederic Raphael published The Hidden I, A Myth Revised, a retelling of the story of Lydia, King Candaules and Gyges.

== Notes ==
Kukas Mermnad dynasty Died: 644 BC
Regnal titles
Preceded by Candaules	King of Lydia c. 680–644 BC	Succeeded by Ardys
