= Tyrrhenus =

Character in Etruscan mythology

In Etruscan mythology, Tyrrhenus (in Greek: Τυῤῥηνός) was one of the founders of the Etruscan League of twelve cities, along with his brother Tarchon.

Herodotus describes him as the saviour of the Etruscans, because he led them from Lydia to Etruria; however this Lydian origin has been debated and disputed as it contradicts archeological, cultural and linguistic evidence, as well as the view held by both the Etruscans themselves and by other Etrusco-Roman and Greek ancient sources. Since ancient times, doubts have been raised about the accuracy of Herodotus' claims. Xanthus of Lydia, originally from Sardis and a great connoisseur of the history of the Lydians, wasn't aware of a Lydian origin of the Etruscans and never mentioned Tyrrhenus in any part of his history as a ruler of the Lydians, as reported by Greek historian Dionysius of Halicarnassus.

Xanthus of Lydia, who was well acquainted with ancient history as any man and who may be regarded as an authority second to none on the history of his own country [and yet he] neither names Tyrrhenus in any part of his history as a ruler of the Lydians nor knows anything of the landing of a colony of Lydians in Italy

There is consensus among modern scholars that Herodotus' claims are not based on real events.

His name was given to the Etruscan people by the Greeks. The Romans extended this use to the sea west of Etruria: the Tyrrhenian Sea.
