= Xanthus (historian) =

5th-century BC Greek historian and logographer

Xanthus of Lydia (Greek: Ξάνθος ὁ Λυδός, Xanthos ho Lydos) was a Greek historian, logographer and citizen of Lydia who, during the mid-fifth century BC, wrote texts on the history of Lydia known as Lydiaca (Λυδιακά), a work which was highly commended by Dionysius of Halicarnassus. Xanthus also wrote occasionally about geology. It is believed that Xanthus was the earliest historian to have written a significant amount on the topic of Lydian history. He is also believed to have written a work entitled Magica (Mαγικά), as well as one entitled Life of Empedocles. It is believed that Xanthus had some knowledge of Persian traditions, and it is plausible that he, a Lydian, would write about Persian religion, but it seems unlikely due to the available evidence. His seat was believed to be at Sardis, the capital. A contemporary and colleague of Herodotus, most of his writings concerned the lineage and deeds of the Lydian kings. Xanthus was known for writing in the traditional Ionian style of trying to establish the scene of popular myths. One example of Xanthus using this type of writing style is when he placed the scene of the "giant's punishment" in Katakekaumene. Xanthus was also known for adapting historical events that were often considered boring into passages that the general Greek public would enjoy. Xanthus was one of the chief authorities used by Nicolaus of Damascus.

== Lydiaca ==
According to references from Stephanus of Byzantium, the Lydiaca (Greek: Λυδιακά, Ludiaka) is believed to be composed of four different books. Unfortunately, it is impossible to tell how Xanthus arranged his material within the books as well as what amount of it would deal with pre-Mermnad dynasty times (i.e. before 700 BC).

Due to his tendency of using anecdotes, it is believed that his historical arrangements within his works may have been loose, like Herodotus. According to a reference from Stephanus of Byzantium, it is believed that part of book IV of the Lydiaca describes the founding of Ascalon, a centre for the cult of Atargatis, from the point of view of a Lydian named Ascalus, the son of Hymenaeus (also known as Tymenaeus) during the rule of king Alkimos (also known as Akiamos).

The credibility of Lydiaca has been questioned numerous times due to conflicting quotations and due to the fact that only fragments of Xanthus' works have survived. Dionysius of Halicarnassus, gives Xanthus the most credibility, because in his paper about Thucydides, he mentions that most historians earlier than Herodotus had “mythographic tendencies,” but gives Xanthus a fair amount of praise. Dionysius of Halicarnassus refers to Xanthus as “a man with an exceptionally sound knowledge of early history, who must be considered second to none in establishing the history of his own country” (I. 28.).

For an intelligent writer like Dionysius to give such a strong statement about Xanthus and his works, it is inferred that he came to his conclusion by studying the original Lydiaca or at least epitome of Menippus, and not by reading the unreliable quotations by Scytobrachion. Many interpret this as evidence that Xanthus’s work was substantive and legitimate, and not just a fabrication of some other writer such as Scytobrachion who attributed quotes to Xanthus that were never said and were actually his own statements. According to Strabo, in the first book of the Lydiaca Xanthus mentions finding rocks in the shape of seashells in many inland areas, such as Armenia, Matiene, and Lower Phrygia, and from this observation he speculates that the entire Anatolian Peninsula was once under water (I. 3, 4).

== Magica ==
The Magica (Greek: Mαγικά, Magika) is referenced once by Clement of Alexandria, but this reference’s credibility is often questioned since Clement of Alexandria also unreliably referenced Xanthus for the date of the founding of Thasos.

== Works cited ==
- Easterling, P. E. and Bernard Knox. Greek Literature. Cambridge: Cambridge UP, 1985. Google Books. Web. 29 Jan. 2010. Greek Literature.
- Marincola, John. Greek Historians. Cambridge: Cambridge UP, 2001. Google Books. Web. 29 Jan. 2010. Greek Historians.
- Pearson, Lionel. Early Ionian Historians. London: Oxford UP, 1939. Print.
- Schmitt, Rüdiger (2016). "XANTHUS THE LYDIAN". Encyclopaedia Iranica.
- Seters, John Van. In Search of History: Historiography in the Ancient World and the Origins of Biblical History. New Haven: Yale UP, 1983. Google Books. Web. 29 Jan. 2010.In Search of History: Historiography in the Ancient World and the Origins of Biblical History.
- Tozer, Henry Fanshawe, and Max Cary. A History of Ancient Geography, Volume 1. Cambridge: Cambridge UP, n.d. Google Books. Web. 29 Jan. 2010. A History of Ancient Geography, Volume 1.
