= List of mortals in Greek mythology =

The following is a list of mortals in Greek mythology, including heroes, mythical kings, and notable women. In Greek mythology, humans are created by Prometheus, who fashions them in the likeness of the gods. While the Greek gods are immortal and unaffected by aging, the mortality of humans forces them to move through the stages of life, before reaching death. The group of figures referred to as "heroes" (or "demigods"), unique to Greek religion and mythology, are (after the time of Homer) individuals who have died but continue to exert power in the world, and who were worshipped in hero cults.

== Heroes ==
- Abderus (Ἄβδηρος), aided Heracles during his eighth labour and was killed by the Mares of Diomedes
- Achilles (Αχιλλεύς), hero of the Trojan War and a central character in Homer's Iliad
- Aeneas (Αἰνείας), a hero of the Trojan War and progenitor of the Roman people
- Ajax the Great (Αίας ο Μέγας), a hero of the Trojan War and king of Salamis
- Ajax the Lesser (Αίας ο Μικρός), a hero of the Trojan War and leader of the Locrian army
- Amphion and Zethus (Ἀμφίων καὶ Ζῆθος), twin sons of Zeus who built the walls of Thebes
- Amphitryon (Αμφιτρύων), Theban general who rescued Thebes from the Teumessian fox; his wife was Alcmene, mother of Heracles
- Anagyros (Ἀνάγυρος), local hero of the Anagyrous deme in Attica
- Antilochus (Ἀντίλοχος), Son of Nestor sacrificed himself to save his father in the Trojan War along with other deeds of valor
- Atalanta (Αταλάντη), fleet-footed heroine who participated in the Calydonian boar hunt and the quest for the Golden Fleece
- Bellerophon (Βελλεροφῶν), hero who slew the Chimera
- Bouzyges (Βουζύγης), a hero credited with inventing agricultural practices such as yoking oxen to a plough
- Caeneus, formerly Caenis, a woman who was transformed into a man and became a mighty warrior and Lapith king
- Castor, the mortal Dioscuri twin; after Castor's death, his immortal brother Pollux shared his divinity with him in order that they might remain together
- Chrysippus (Χρύσιππος), a divine hero of Elis
- Daedalus (Δαίδαλος), creator of the labyrinth and great inventor, until King Minos trapped him in his own creation
- Diomedes (Διομήδης), a king of Argos and hero of the Trojan War
- Eleusis (Ἐλευσίς), eponymous hero of the town of Eleusis
- Eunostus (Εὔνωστος)), a Boeotian hero
- Ganymede (Γανυμήδης), Trojan hero and lover of Zeus, who was given immortality and appointed cup-bearer to the gods
- Hector (Ἕκτωρ), hero of the Trojan War and champion of the Trojan people
- Icarus (Ἴκαρος), the son of the master craftsman Daedalus
- Iolaus (Ἰόλαος), nephew of Heracles who aided his uncle in one of his Labors
- Jason (Ἰάσων), leader of the Argonauts
- Meleager (Μελέαγρος), a hero who sailed with the Argonauts and killed the Calydonian boar
- Odysseus (Ὀδυσσεύς or Ὀδυσεύς), a hero and king of Ithaca whose adventures are the subject of Homer's Odyssey; he also played a key role during the Trojan War
- Oedipus (Οἰδίπους), Theban hero who defeated the Sphinx by solving her riddle
- Orpheus (Ὀρφεύς), a legendary musician and poet who attempted to retrieve his dead wife from the Underworld
- Pandion (Πανδίων), the eponymous hero of the Attic tribe Pandionis, usually assumed to be one of the legendary Athenian kings Pandion I or Pandion II
- Pelops (Πέλοψ), hero of the western Pelopponese who founded the Olympic Games
- Perseus (Περσεύς), son of Zeus and the founder-king of Mycenae and slayer of the Gorgon Medusa
- Phaethon, son of Helios who tried and failed to drive his father's sun-chariot for one day
- Talthybius (Ταλθύβιος), herald and friend to Agamemnon. He was worshipped as a hero at Sparta and Argos, where sacrifices were offered to him.
- Telephus (Τήλεφος), a son of Heracles who fought against the Achaeans early in the Trojan War
- Theseus (Θησεύς), son of Poseidon and a king of Athens and slayer of the Minotaur
- Triptolemus (Τριπτόλεμος), a favourite of Demeter who introduced agriculture to mortals

== Notable women ==
- Alcestis (Άλκηστις), daughter of Pelias and wife of Admetus, who was known for her devotion to her husband
- Amymone, the one daughter of Danaus who refused to murder her husband, thus escaping her sisters' punishment
- Andromache (Ανδρομάχη), wife of Hector
- Andromeda (Ανδρομέδα), wife of Perseus, who was placed among the constellations after her death
- Antigone (Αντιγόνη), daughter of Oedipus and Jocasta
- Apemosyne (Ἀπημοσύνη), a Cretan princess who ran faster than Hermes
- Arachne (Αράχνη), a skilled weaver, transformed by Athena into a spider for her blasphemy
- Ariadne (Αριάδνη), daughter of Minos, king of Crete, who aided Theseus in overcoming the Minotaur and became the wife of Dionysus
- Briseis, a princess of Lyrnessus, taken and given to Achilles as a war prize
- Cassandra, a princess of Troy cursed to see the future but never to be believed
- Cassiopeia (Κασσιόπεια), queen of Æthiopia and mother of Andromeda
- Clytemnestra, sister of Helen and unfaithful wife of Agamemnon
- Danaë, the mother of Perseus by Zeus
- Deianeira, the third wife and unwitting killer of Heracles
- Electra, daughter of Agamemnon and Clytemnestra, she aided her brother Orestes in plotting revenge against their mother for the murder of their father
- Europa, a Phoenician woman, abducted by Zeus
- Hecuba (Ἑκάβη), wife of Priam, king of Troy, and mother of nineteen of his children
- Helen, daughter of Zeus and Leda, whose abduction brought about the Trojan War
- Hermione (Ἑρμιόνη), daughter of Menelaus and Helen; wife of Neoptolemus, and later Orestes
- Iphigenia, daughter of Agamemnon and Clytemnestra; Agamemnon sacrificed her to Artemis in order to appease the goddess
- Ismene, sister of Antigone
- Jocasta, mother and wife of Oedipus
- Medea, a sorceress and wife of Jason, who killed her own children to punish Jason for his infidelity
- Medusa, a mortal woman transformed into a hideous gorgon by Athena
- Niobe, a daughter of Tantalus who declared herself to be superior to Leto, causing Artemis and Apollo to kill her fourteen children
- Pandora, the first woman
- Penelope, loyal wife of Odysseus
- Phaedra, daughter of Minos and wife of Theseus
- Polyxena, the youngest daughter of Priam, sacrificed to the ghost of Achilles
- Semele, mortal mother of Dionysus
- Thrace, the daughter of Oceanus and Parthenope, and sister of Europa

== Kings ==
- Abas, a king of Argos
- Acastus, a king of Iolcus who sailed with the Argonauts and participated in the Calydonian boar hunt
- Acrisius, a king of Argos
- Actaeus, first king of Attica
- Admetus (Άδμητος), a king of Pherae who sailed with the Argonauts and participated in the Calydonian boar hunt
- Adrastus (Άδραστος), a king of Argos and one of the Seven against Thebes
- Aeacus (Αιακός), a king of the island of Aegina in the Saronic Gulf; after he died, he became one of the three judges of the dead in the Underworld
- Aeëtes, a king of Colchis and father of Medea
- Aegeus (Αιγεύς), a king of Athens and father of Theseus
- Aegimius, a king of Thessaly and progenitor of the Dorians
- Aegisthus (Αίγισθος), lover of Clytemnestra, with whom he plotted to murder Agamemnon and seized the kingship of Mycenae
- Aegyptus (Αίγυπτος), a king of Egypt
- Aeson, father of Jason and rightful king of Iolcus, whose throne was usurped by his half-brother Pelias
- Aëthlius, first king of Elis
- Aetolus (Αιτωλός), a king of Elis
- Agamemnon (Ἀγαμέμνων), a king of Mycenae and commander of the Greek armies during the Trojan War
- Agasthenes, a king of Elis
- Agenor (Αγήνωρ), a king of Phoenicia
- Alcinous (Αλκίνους or Ἀλκίνοος), a king of Phaeacia
- Alcmaeon, a king of Argos and one of the Epigoni
- Aleus, a king of Tegea
- Amphiaraus (Ἀμφιάραος), a seer and king of Argos who participated in the Calydonian boar hunt and the war of the Seven against Thebes
- Amphictyon (Ἀμφικτύων), a king of Athens
- Amphion and Zethus, twin sons of Zeus and kings of Thebes, who constructed the city's walls
- Amycus, son of Poseidon and king of the Bebryces
- Anaxagoras (Ἀναξαγόρας), a king of Argos
- Anchises (Αγχίσης), a king of Dardania and father of Aeneas
- Arcesius, a king of Ithaca and father of Laertes
- Argeus, a king of Argos
- Argus, a son of Zeus and king of Argos after Phoroneus
- Assaracus, a king of Dardania
- Asterion, a king of Crete
- Athamas (Ἀθάμας), a king of Orchomenus
- Atreus (Ἀτρεύς), a king of Mycenae and father of Agamemnon and Menelaus
- Augeas (Αυγείας), a king of Elis
- Autesion, a king of Thebes
- Bias, a king of Argos
- Busiris, a king of Egypt
- Cadmus, founder-king of Thebes
- Caeneus, formerly Caenis, a woman who was transformed into a man and became a mighty warrior and Lapith king
- Car, a king of Megara
- Catreus, a king of Crete, prophesied to die at the hands of his own son
- Cecrops, an autochthonous king of Athens
- Ceisus, a king of Argos
- Celeus, a king of Eleusis
- Cephalus, a king of Phocis who accidentally killed his own wife
- Cepheus, a king of Ethiopia
- Cepheus, a king of Tegea and an Argonaut
- Charnabon, a king of the Getae
- Cinyras, a king of Cyprus and father of Adonis
- Codrus, a king of Athens
- Corinthus, founder-king of Corinth
- Cranaus, a king of Athens
- Creon, a king of Thebes, brother of Jocasta and uncle of Oedipus
- Creon, a king of Corinth who was hospitable towards Jason and Medea
- Cres, an early Cretan king
- Cresphontes, a king of Messene and descendant of Heracles
- Cretheus, founder-king of Iolcus
- Criasus, a king of Argos
- Cylarabes, a king of Argos
- Cynortas, a king of Sparta
- Cyzicus, king of the Dolionians, mistakenly killed by the Argonauts
- Danaus, a king of Egypt and father of the Danaides
- Dardanus, founder-king of Dardania, and son of Zeus and Electra
- Deiphontes, a king of Argos
- Demophon of Athens, a king of Athens
- Diomedes, a king of Argos and hero of the Trojan War
- Echemus, a king of Arcadia
- Echetus, a king, probably ruling in mainland Greece
- Eetion, a king of Cilician Thebe and father of Andromache
- Electryon, a king of Tiryns and Mycenae; son of Perseus and Andromeda
- Elephenor, a king of the Abantes of Euboea
- Eleusis, eponym and king of Eleusis, Attica
- Epaphus, a king of Egypt and founder of Memphis, Egypt
- Epopeus, a king of Sicyon
- Erechtheus, a king of Athens
- Erginus, a king of Minyean Orchomenus in Boeotia
- Erichthonius, a king of Athens, born of Hephaestus' attempt to rape Athena
- Eteocles, a king of Thebes and son of Oedipus; he and his brother Polynices killed each other
- Eteocles, son of Andreus, a king of Orchomenus
- Eurotas, a king of Sparta
- Eurystheus, a king of Tiryns
- Euxantius, a king of Ceos, son of Minos and Dexithea
- Gelanor, a king of Argos
- Haemus, a king of Thrace
- Helenus, seer and twin brother of Cassandra, who later became king of Epirus
- Hippothoön, a king of Eleusis
- Hyrieus, a king of Boeotia
- Ilus, founder-king of Troy
- Ixion, a king of the Lapiths who attempted to rape Hera and was bound to a flaming wheel in Tartarus
- Laërtes, father of Odysseus and king of the Cephallenians; he sailed with the Argonauts and participated in the Calydonian boar hunt
- Laomedon, a king of Troy and father of Priam
- Lycaon of Arcadia, a deceitful Arcadian king who was transformed by Zeus into a wolf
- Lycurgus of Arcadia, a king of Arcadia
- Lycurgus, a king of Nemea, and/or a priest of Zeus at Nemea
- Makedon, a king of Macedon
- Megareus of Onchestus, a king of Onchestus in Boeotia
- Megareus of Thebes, a king of Thebes
- Melampus, a legendary soothsayer and healer, and king of Argos
- Melanthus, a king of Messenia
- Memnon, a king of Ethiopia who fought on the side of Troy during the Trojan War
- Menelaus, a king of Sparta and the husband of Helen
- Menestheus, a king of Athens who fought on the side of the Greeks during the Trojan War
- Midas, a king of Phrygia granted the power to turn anything to gold with a touch
- Minos, a king of Crete; after his death, became one of the judges of the dead in the Underworld
- Myles, a king of Laconia
- Nestor, a king of Pylos who sailed with the Argonauts, participated in the Calydonian boar hunt and fought with the Greek armies in the Trojan War
- Nycteus, a king of Thebes
- Odysseus, a hero and king of Ithaca whose adventures are the subject of Homer's Odyssey; he also played a key role during the Trojan War
- Oebalus, a king of Sparta
- Oedipus, a king of Thebes fated to kill his father and marry his mother
- Oeneus, a king of Calydon
- Oenomaus, a king of Pisa
- Oenopion, a king of Chios
- Ogygus, a king of Thebes
- Oicles, a king of Argos
- Oileus, a king of Locris
- Orestes, a king of Argos and a son of Clytemnestra and Agamemnon; he killed his mother in revenge for her murder of his father
- Oxyntes, a king of Athens
- Pandion I, a king of Athens
- Pandion II, a king of Athens
- Peleus, king of the Myrmidons and father of Achilles; he sailed with the Argonauts and participated in the Calydonian boar hunt
- Pelias, a king of Iolcus and usurper of Aeson's rightful throne
- Pelops, a king of Pisa and founder of the House of Atreus
- Pentheus, a king of Thebes who banned the worship of Dionysus and was torn apart by Maenads
- Periphas, legendary king of Attica who Zeus turned into an eagle
- Perseus (Περσεύς), founder-king of Mycenae and slayer of the Gorgon Medusa
- Phineus, a king of Thrace
- Phlegyas, a king of the Lapiths
- Phoenix, son of Agenor, founder-king of Phoenicia
- Phoroneus, a king of Argos
- Phyleus, a king of Elis
- Pirithoös, king of the Lapiths and husband of Hippodamia, at whose wedding the Battle of Lapiths and Centaurs occurred
- Pittheus, a king of Troezen and grandfather of Theseus
- Polybus of Corinth, a king of Corinth
- Polybus of Sicyon, a king of Sicyon and son of Hermes
- Polybus of Thebes, a king of Thebes
- Polynices, a king of Thebes and son of Oedipus; he and his brother Eteocles killed each other
- Priam, king of Troy during the Trojan War
- Proetus, a king of Argos and Tiryns
- Pylades, a king of Phocis and friend of Orestes
- Rhadamanthys, a king of Crete; after his death, he became a judge of the dead in the Underworld
- Rhesus, a king of Thrace who sided with Troy in the Trojan War
- Sarpedon, a king of Lycia and son of Zeus who fought on the side of Troy during the Trojan War
- Sisyphus, a king of Thessaly who attempted to cheat death and was sentenced to an eternity of rolling a boulder up a hill, only to watch it roll back down
- Sithon, a king of Thrace
- Talaus, a king of Argos who sailed with the Argonauts
- Tegyrios, a king of Thrace
- Telamon, a king of Salamis and father of Ajax; he sailed with the Argonauts and participated in the Calydonian boar hunt
- Telephus, a king of Mysia and son of Heracles
- Temenus, a king of Argos and descendant of Heracles
- Teucer, founder-king of Salamis who fought alongside the Greeks in the Trojan War
- Teutamides, a king of Larissa
- Teuthras, a king of Mysia
- Thersander, a king of Thebes and one of the Epigoni
- Theseus, a king of Athens and slayer of the Minotaur
- Thyestes, a king of Mycenae and brother of Atreus
- Tisamenus, a king of Argos, Mycenae, and Sparta
- Tyndareus, a king of Sparta

== Seers/oracles ==
- Amphilochus (Ἀμφίλοχος), a seer and brother of Alcmaeon who died in the war of the Seven against Thebes
- Anius, son of Apollo who prophesied that the Trojan War would be won in its tenth year
- Asbolus, a seer Centaur
- Bakis
- Branchus, a seer and son of Apollo
- Calchas, an Argive seer who aided the Greeks during the Trojan War
- Carnus, an Acarnanian seer and lover of Apollo
- Carya, a seer and lover of Dionysus
- Cassandra, a princess of Troy cursed to see the future but never to be believed
- Ennomus, a Mysian seer, killed by Achilles during the Trojan War
- Halitherses, an Ithacan seer who warned Penelope's suitors of Odysseus' return
- Helenus, seer and twin brother of Cassandra, who later became king of Epirus
- Iamus, a son of Apollo possessing the gift of prophecy, he founded the Iamidai
- Idmon, a seer who sailed with the Argonauts
- Manto, seer and daughter of Tiresias
- Melampus, a legendary soothsayer and healer, and king of Argos
- Mopsus, the name of two legendary seers
- Polyeidos, a Corinthian seer who saved the life of Glaucus
- Pythia, the oracle of Delphi
- Telemus, a seer who foresaw that the Cyclops Polyphemus would be blinded by Odysseus
- Theoclymenus, an Argive seer
- Tiresias, blind prophet of Thebes

== Amazons ==
- Aegea, a queen of the Amazons
- Aella (Ἄελλα), an Amazon who was killed by Heracles
- Alcibie (Ἀλκιβίη), an Amazonian warrior, killed by Diomedes at Troy
- Antandre (Ἀντάνδρη), an Amazonian warrior, killed by Achilles at Troy
- Antiope (Ἀντιόπη), a daughter of Ares and sister of Hippolyta
- Areto (Ἀρετώ), an Amazon
- Asteria (Ἀστερία), an Amazon who was killed by Heracles
- Bremusa (Βρέμουσα), an Amazonian warrior, killed by Idomeneus at Troy
- Celaeno (Κελαινώ), an Amazonian warrior, killed by Heracles
- Eurypyle (Εὐρυπύλη), an Amazon leader who invaded Ninus and Babylonia
- Hippolyta (Ἱππολύτη), a queen of Amazons and daughter of Ares
- Hippothoe (Ἱπποθόη), an Amazonian warrior, killed by Achilles at Troy
- Iphito (Ἰφιτώ), an Amazon who served under Hippolyta
- Lampedo (Λαμπεδώ), an Amazon queen who ruled with her sister Marpesia
- Marpesia (Μαρπεσία), an Amazon queen who ruled with her sister Lampedo
- Melanippe (Μελανίππη), a daughter of Ares and sister of Hippolyta and Antiope
- Molpadia (Μολπαδία), an Amazon who killed Antiope
- Myrina (Μύρινα), a queen of the Amazons
- Orithyia (Ὠρείθυια), an Amazon queen
- Otrera (Ὀτρήρα), an Amazon queen, consort of Ares and mother of Hippolyta
- Pantariste (Πανταρίστη), an Amazon who fought with Hippolyta against Heracles
- Penthesilea (Πενθεσίλεια), an Amazon queen who fought in the Trojan War on the side of Troy
- Thalestris (Θάληστρις), a queen of the Amazons

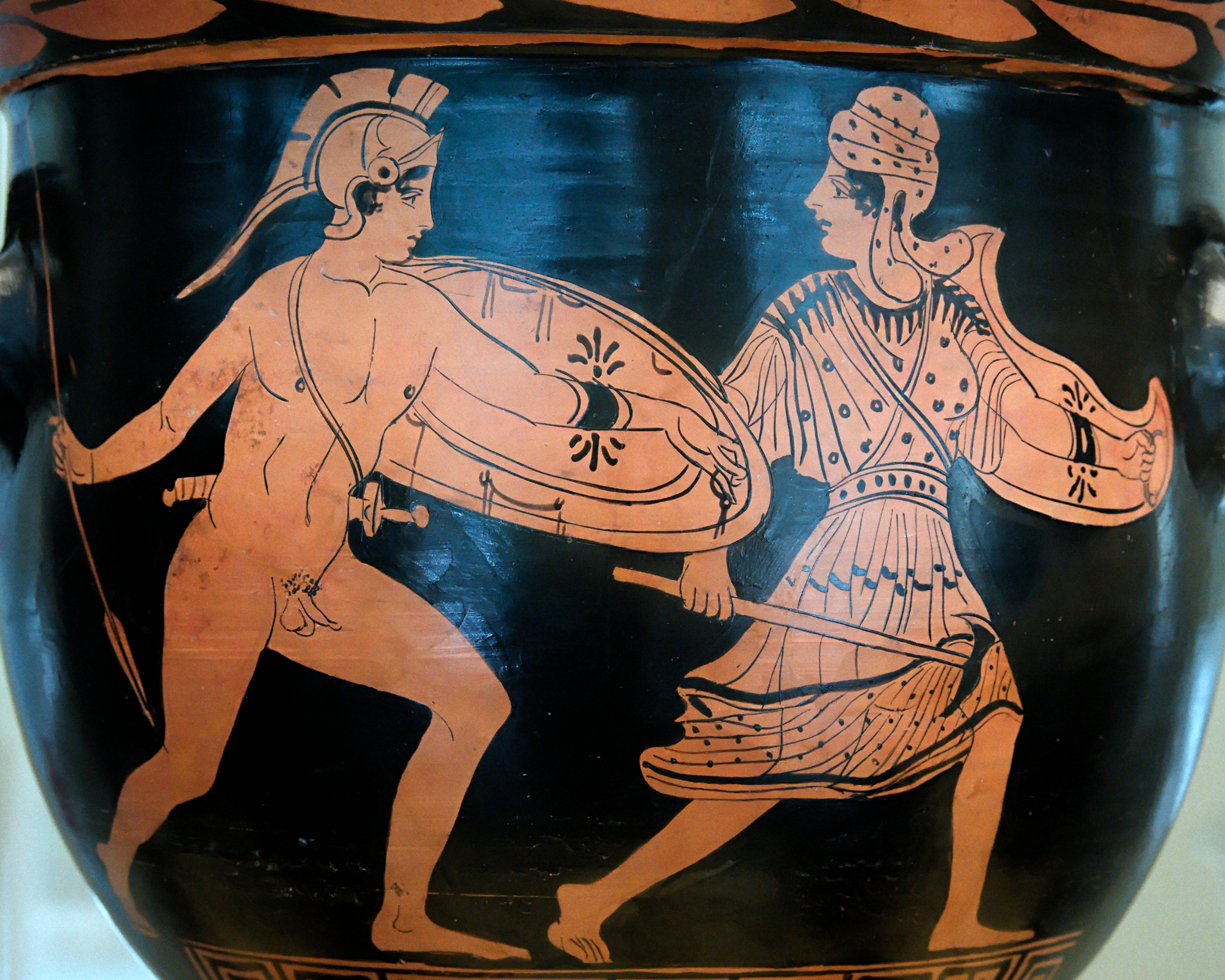
Achilles and Penthesileia (Lucanian red-figure bell-krater, late 5th century BC)

== Inmates of Tartarus ==
- The Danaïdes, the forty-nine daughters of Danaus who murdered their husbands on their wedding night, were condemned to an eternity of carrying water in leaky jugs.
- Ixion, king of the Lapiths, who attempted to rape Hera, was bound to a flaming, ever-spinning wheel in Tartarus as eternal punishment.
- Sisyphus, a king of Thessaly who tried to cheat death, was condemned to an eternity of rolling a boulder uphill, only to watch it roll back down each time.
- Tantalus, a king of Anatolia who butchered his son Pelops and served him as a meal to the gods, was punished with eternal starvation—food and drink forever dangling just out of reach.
- Pirithous, king of the Lapiths and the closest companion of Theseus, attempted to kidnap Persephone to make her his wife. As punishment, he was either bound to a chair by snakes for eternity or devoured by Cerberus, depending on the version of the myth.

== See also ==
- List of Trojan War characters
- List of Greek deities
- List of Greek mythological creatures
