= Hyrnetho =

Woman in Greek mythology

In Greek mythology, Hyrnetho (Ancient Greek: Ὑρνηθώ, romanized: Hurnēthṓ) was a daughter of Temenus, and the wife of Deiphontes, by whom she became mother of Antimenes, Xanthippus, Argeius, and Orsobia.

Temenus favored his daughter Hyrnetho and her husband Deiphontes more than his sons, Hyrnetho's brothers, and planned on making Deiphontes his heir. His sons plotted against him and killed him, but nevertheless, the kingdom of Argos passed to Deiphontes and Hyrnetho, since the army supported them rather than Temenus' sons; alternately, the kingdom was seized by Ceisus, the eldest son of Temenus.

The brothers knew they would hurt their rival Deiphontes the most if they separated him from Hyrnetho. So Cerynes and Phalces, ignoring the objections of their youngest brother Agraeus, came to Epidaurus, where Hyrnetho and Deiphontes resided. At first they tried to persuade Hyrnetho to leave her husband and go with them, promising her to marry her to a better person and making heavy accusations against Deiphontes. She didn't believe any of the accusations and defended her husband passionately; so the brothers simply carried her off by force.

Upon hearing of it, Deiphontes rushed to her rescue. He shot Cerynes with an arrow, but was afraid to shoot at Phalces, who was holding Hyrnetho; he caught up with his chariot and attempted to get Hyrnetho away. But Phalces dragged her back with such violence that it killed her (she was pregnant at the time).

Hyrnetho was buried by her husband and children at a place which later received the name of Hyrnethium. Her tomb and a heroum, with a sacred grove, were shown at Epidaurus and Argos.
