= The Race Between Hippomenes and Atalanta =

Painting by Noël Hallé

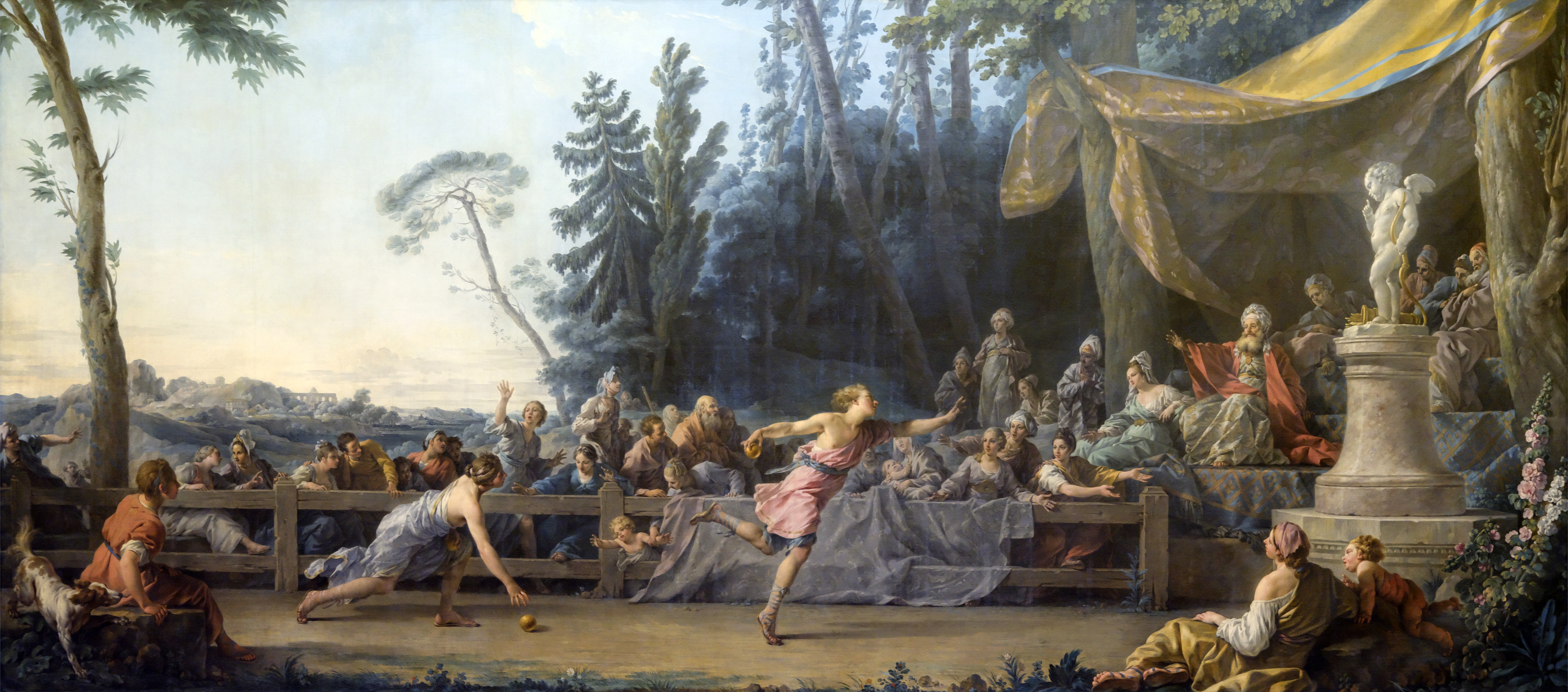
- Artist: Noël Hallé
- Year: 1765
- Type: Oil on canvas, history painting
- Dimensions: 321 cm × 712 cm (126 in × 280 in)
- Location: Louvre, Paris

The Race Between Hippomenes and Atalanta (French: La Course d'Hippomène et d'Atalante) is a 1765 history painting by the French artist Noël Hallé. Inspired by a story from Ovid's Metamorphoses, it depicts the foot race between Hippomenes and Atalanta. The famously fast Atalanta suggested they only the suitor who could outrun her was fit to marry her, those who lost would be put to death. With the assistance of Venus who sent golden apples to distract her, Hippomenes was able to defeat Atalanta.

The work was originally commissioned by Marquis of Marigny, the director general of the Ministry of Works, as the basis for a tapestry made by Gobelins Manufactory.

It was displayed at the Salon of 1765 held at the Louvre, in Paris. Today the painting is part of the permanent collection of the Louvre.

== Bibliography ==
- Bailey, Colin B. The Age of Watteau, Chardin, and Fragonard: Masterpieces of French Genre Painting. Yale University Press, 2003.
- Spieth, Darius A. Napoleon's Sorcerers: The Sophisians. University of Delaware Press, 2007.
