= Pantariste =

Mythical Greek warrior

In Greek mythology, Pantariste (Ancient Greek: Πανταρίστη) was an Amazon who fought on Hippolyte's side against Heracles and his troops.

A black-figure vase painting of the 6th century BCE depicts Pantariste defeating the Greek warrior Timiades. The same painting features two other similar "Greek hero vs. Amazon" fighting scenes: Heracles about to kill Andromache; and Telamon attacking Ainippe.

== See also ==
- Antiope (Amazon)
- Orithyia (Amazon)
- Areto
- Iphito
