= Apples of the Hesperides =

Labor of Heracles

The Apples of the Hesperides were golden apples in Greek mythology, kept in a garden at the far western edge of the world. According to myth, the apples were a wedding gift from Gaia to Hera, and they were said to grant immortality. The apples were closely guarded by the Hesperides, nymphs of the evening, and the serpent-dragon Ladon. The apples were the object of Heracles' Eleventh Labour, in which he was tasked with retrieving them for King Eurystheus.

== Mythology ==
=== Origins and the Garden of the Hesperides ===
The Apples of the Hesperides were kept in an orchard known as the Garden of the Hesperides. According to Hesiod's Theogony, Gaia presented the apples to Hera as a gift upon her marriage to Zeus. The goddess Hera planted them in a divine garden located at the westernmost point of the world near the Atlas mountain range, which in ancient times was identified with the westernmost part of Libya (now North Africa), Morocco.

The garden was watched over by the Hesperides, daughters of either Nyx (Night) or the Titan Atlas, depending on the source. Additionally, the apples were protected by the serpent-dragon Ladon, who prevented anyone from stealing them.

=== The Eleventh Labour of Heracles ===
The most famous myth associated with the Apples of the Hesperides is the Eleventh Labour of Heracles. King Eurystheus ordered Heracles to retrieve the apples as part of his Twelve Labours.

There are two major versions of how Heracles completed this task:

1. The Atlas Version: In this account, Heracles sought guidance from the Titan Prometheus, whom he freed from his punishment by Zeus. Prometheus advised him to ask Atlas for help. In exchange for fetching the apples, Atlas asked Heracles to temporarily hold up the sky. Atlas then retrieved the apples but refused to take back his burden. Heracles tricked him by pretending to adjust his position, at which point Atlas reassumed his burden, allowing Heracles to escape with the apples.
2. The Direct Theft Version: In some versions, Heracles directly entered the garden, either by killing Ladon or by using trickery, and stole the apples himself.

After completing the labour, Heracles brought the apples to Eurystheus. However, in many versions of the myth, the apples were ultimately returned to the gods, as they belonged to Hera.

=== Other appearances in mythology ===
While the Apples of the Hesperides are primarily associated with Heracles, similar golden apples appear elsewhere in Greek mythology:

- Atalanta's Race: The story of Atalanta involves golden apples given to Hippomenes by Aphrodite, which he used to distract Atalanta during a race, allowing him to win her hand in marriage.
- The Apple of Discord: The Apple of Discord, which played a key role in the events leading to the Trojan War, is sometimes confused with the Apples of the Hesperides. However, this apple was thrown by Eris, the goddess of strife, at the wedding of Peleus and Thetis.

== Symbolism and interpretations ==
The golden apples have been interpreted as symbols of:

- Immortality – The apples are often connected to divine foods such as ambrosia and nectar, which confer eternal life.
- A Western Paradise – Some scholars, including Walter Burkert, suggest that the Garden of the Hesperides reflects ancient Greek notions of a utopian paradise located at the far west of the world, akin to Elysium.
- The Hero’s Ultimate Test – The Eleventh Labor represents a final challenge before Heracles’ apotheosis (deification).

== Classical sources ==
- Hesiod, Theogony 215–216.
- Apollodorus, Bibliotheca 2.5.11.
- Diodorus Siculus, Bibliotheca Historica 4.26.
- Hyginus, Fabulae 30.
- Pseudo-Apollodorus, Epitome 3.2.
- Ovid, Metamorphoses 10.560–680.
