= Arotoi Hieroi =

Ancient Greek festival

Under the name Sacred Plowings (Ancient Greek: ἄροτοι ἱεροί), three religious ceremonies were performed in ancient Athens that were held in Maimacterion (Nov.-Dec.).

The first took place at the location "Sciros" near Athens, in commemoration of the first sowing in Attica. The second was held at the "Rarion Field" near Elefsina, where, according to local tradition, barley was first cultivated, and where the threshing floor of Triptolemus was located. Lastly, the third took place within the city of Athens, in a field called Bouzygion (Βουζύγιον), on the northeastern slopes of the Acropolis. In this field, wheat intended for the worship of Athena was sown, and possibly for Zeus Polieus as well.

This third celebration was also called the "Bouzygian Plowing" or "Bouzygian Arable Rites," held in memory of the first sowing of wheat in Athens by the hero Bouzyges, who was the first to yoke oxen (plowing oxen) for sowing. Before teaching the method of sowing and becoming a national hero of Athens, Bouzyges was the ancestor of the priestly family of the Bouzygoi, who later oversaw these ceremonies and maintained a large number of oxen in Athens and Eleusis.

There was also an epithet and invocation of Athena as "Bouzygian" in all three ceremonies, as she was considered the inventor of the plow, hence the name of these ceremonies.

The three fields where the Bouzygoi performed the sacred plowings (cultivation, plowing) were likely not far from each other, as the ceremonies could be completed on the same day. However, it is also possible that the three ceremonies were successive acts of the same ritual, performed at three consecutive locations. Most likely, these ceremonies were a religiously framed agricultural practice and an early form of agricultural education on the threefold plowing, which is still known today as "three plowings" (of the field), performed during the same year, in different seasons: spring, summer, and autumn.

== See also ==
- Arrephoria
- Thesmophoria
- Skirophoria

== Bibliography ==
- Drandakis, P. (1929). Great Greek Encyclopedia. Vol. 5, p. 643. Athens: Drandakis Publishing House. (in Greek)
