= Hippomenes =

Figure from Greek myth, husband of Atalanta

The name Hippomenes may also refer to the father of Leimone.

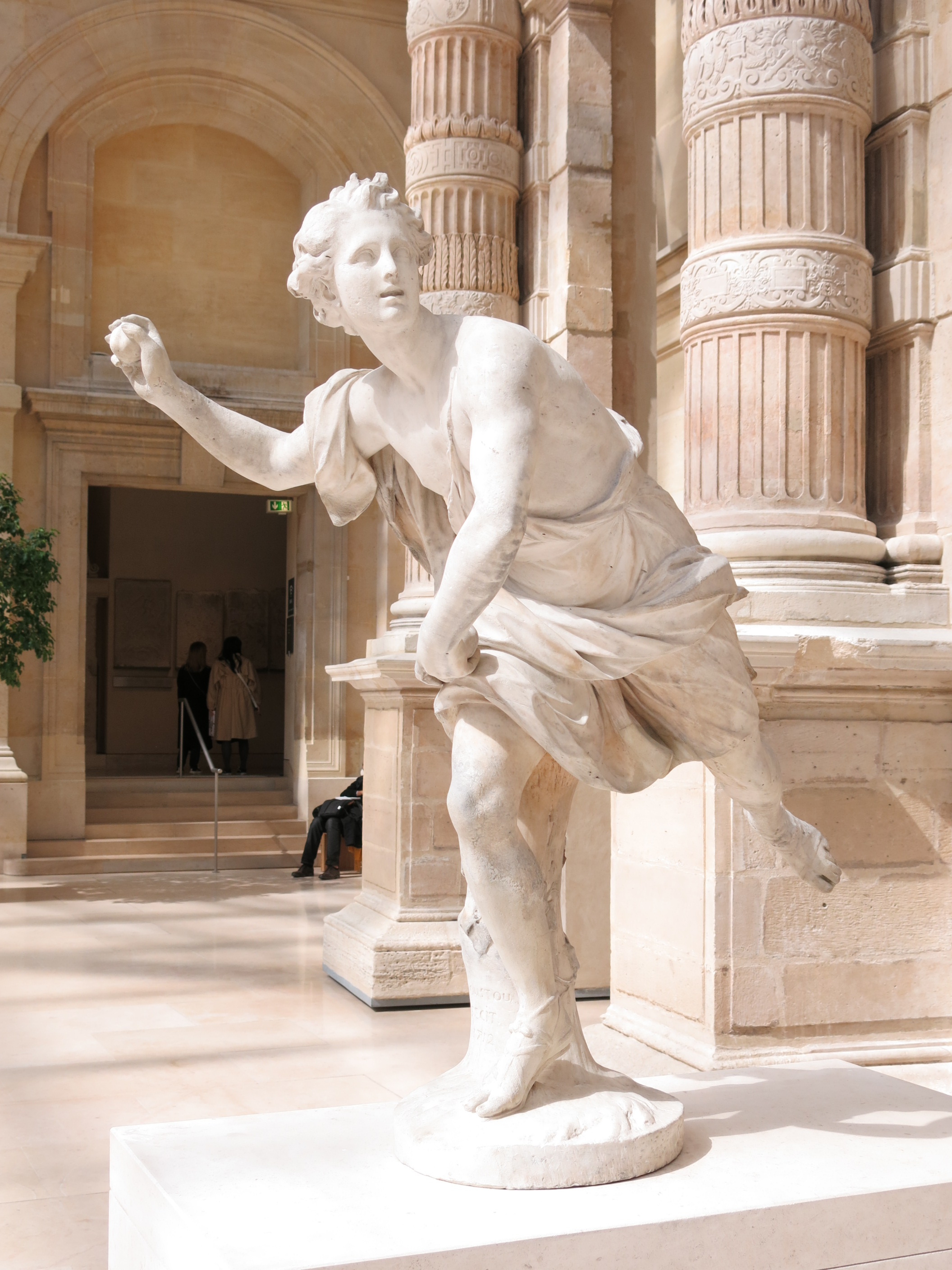
Marble statue of Hippomenes by Guillaume Coustou. Louvre museum in Paris, France

In Greek mythology, Hippomenes (/hɪˈpɒmɪniːz/; Ancient Greek: Ἱππομένης, romanized: Hippoménēs) is a Boeotian prince, the son of Megareus. Hippomenes married Atalanta, the virginal runner, after defeating her in a footrace with the help of Aphrodite, the goddess of love. Later the two were transformed into lions when they offended the gods.

Although often identified with Melanion, Atalanta's husband in other versions, he is distinct from him.

== Family ==
The Boeotian Hippomenes was the son of King Megareus of Onchestus and his wife Merope.

== Mythology ==
=== Footrace ===
Hippomenes features in the myth of his footrace against Atalanta. The notoriously swift runner Atalanta, who wished to remain unwed in spite of her father's wishes, set a condition that she would only marry the man who would beat her in a footrace. No potential suitor could outrun her, and the penalty for the loser was death. In some versions, the suitor would be given a head start while Atalanta pursued armed, and the moment she overtook the man before the finish line, she would kill him and mount his head on the stadium.

After she had killed many, Hippomenes came by her lands, with a dismissive attitude against the men who lost their lives for a chance of marriage, thinking them as foolish. But when he saw Atalanta racing nude against a suitor, he was too struck by desire, and expressed his wish to be the next one to enter the competition. Atalanta in turn, on account of both his looks and youth, advised him to leave and not risk his life just to marry her. Hippomenes did not back down, and insisted on racing her. Aphrodite, impressed, decided to help him out by gifting him three golden apples, plucked from a tree in her sacred island of Cyprus, or from the garden of the Hesperides.

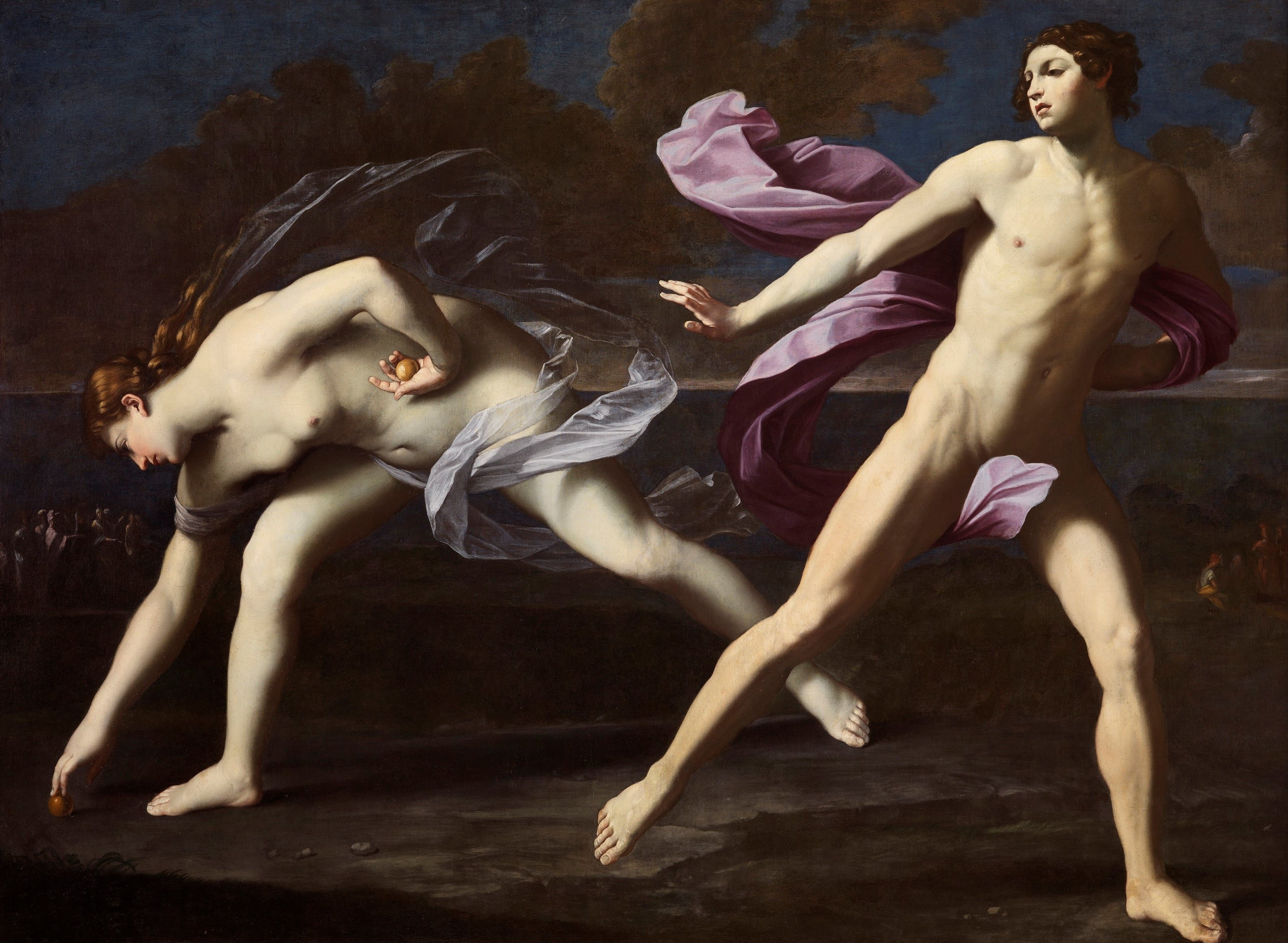
Atalanta and Hippomenes, Guido Reni, c. 1622–25.

The race began then, and although Atalanta could overtake him, she tried not to. Hippomenes, seeing that he was going to lose, dropped one of the golden apples Aphrodite had given him, and she halted so that she could retrieve it, giving Hippomenes a lead that she closed as she caught up to him. Hippomenes then dropped the second of the golden apples, and once more Atalanta wasted time on, but again she covered the lost ground quickly. Finally, just before the finish line he dropped the third and final apple, and Atalanta hesitated for a moment; this time Aphrodite made sure Atalanta went to collect it, and it made it heavier than it was before. Hippomenes thus won the race, and Atalanta's hand in marriage.

=== Later life ===
Although Hippomenes achieved his goal, he forgot to properly thank Aphrodite for her divine assistance, so the goddess took her revenge against him. One day that he and Atalanta were passing by a precinct sacred to either Zeus or Cybele, she inspired them with great lust and the two had sex on the holy place. The deity, offended, changed them both into lions. In the Cybele version, the goddess then yoked them to her chariot so that they would pull it for all time. In Nonnus, the agent behind their transformation was Artemis.

Although according to some accounts his doublet Melanion is the father of Atalanta's son Parthenopaeus (other candidates include Meleager and Ares), Hippomenes himself is not made the boy's father in any known version.

== Interpretation ==
=== Versions ===
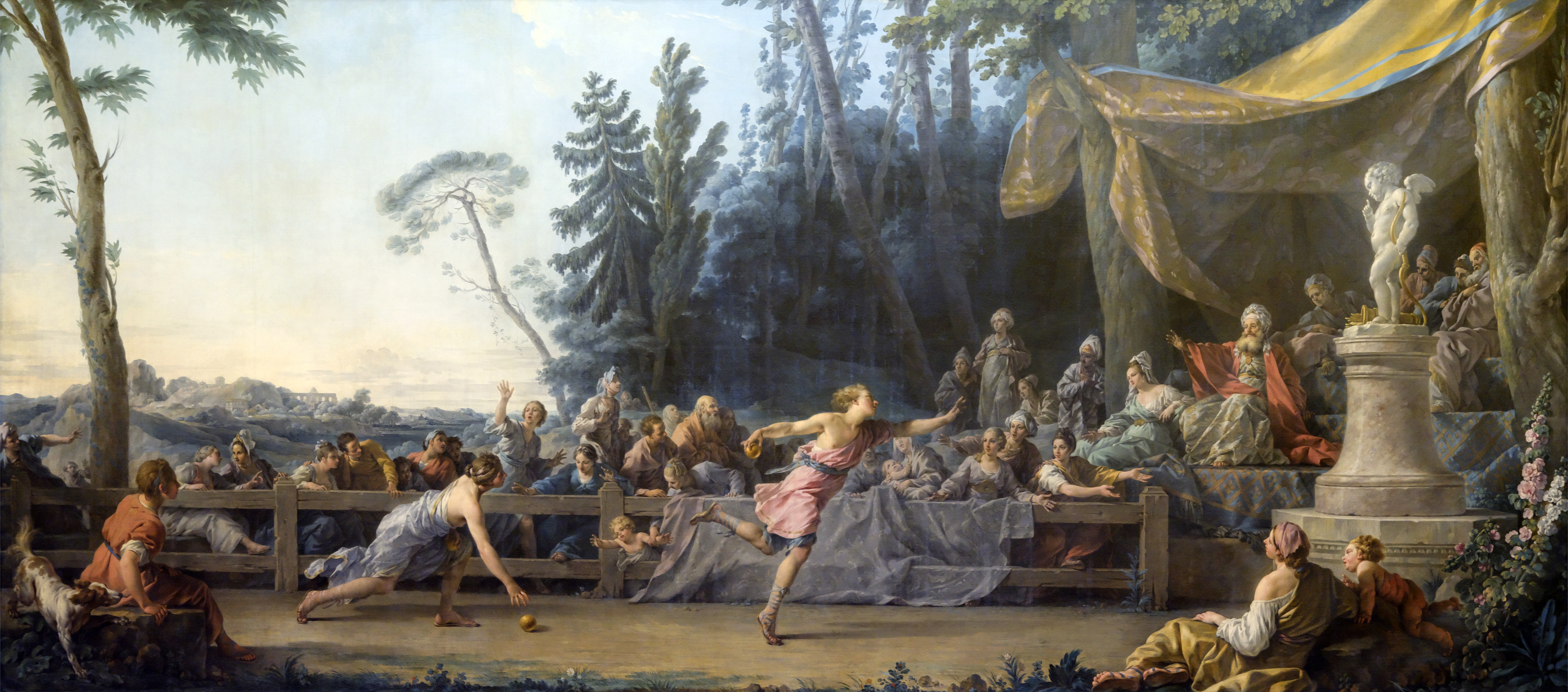
The Race Between Hippomenes and Atalanta by Noël Hallé, 1765, kept in the Louvre Museum, France.

The earliest attestation of the story is a reconstructed fragment from the lost Hesiodic poem Catalogue of Women, in which Atalanta yields to his voice that calls on her to receive the gifts of 'golden Aphrodite.' According to a scholiast, Hesiod presented Hippomenes as racing naked. In some versions, the competitors ran a simple race with Hippomenes throwing the apples forward and to the side, while in others the race is a mock-hunt where Atalanta chases the suitor, which is possibly the one described in the Catalogue, though the passage is too fragmentary.

Hippomenes springs from the Boeotian version, one of the two major branches regarding Atalanta's mythos, the other being the Arcadian one, where his wife has a different parentage. There is a debate whether those were two different figures, or a single one with divergent traditions. Although Atalanta features in a number of stories such as the Calydonian boar hunt or the journey of the Argonauts, Hippomenes does not join her in them and does not have a role outside the myths regarding the footrace and the lion transformation.

Due to the blurring of lines between Arcadian and Boeotian Atalanta, Hippomenes was to some extent conflated with Melanion, a hunter and Atalanta's husband in the Arcadian version, who joins her in the boar hunt myth and becomes the father of Parthenopaeus. In fact the oldest attestation of the lion metamorphosis features Melanion, whereas Apollodorus in the second century is the first author to give Melanion the footrace myth. Apollodorus also calls Hippomenes a hunter, like Atalanta and Melanion. In the Arcadian setting, Melanion's way of wooing Atalanta is different; he wins her heart out of devotion and 'great labour', accompanying her in hunting, caring for her gear and even suffering a wound at the hands of the centaur harassing her.

=== Sexuality and marriage ===
In Theocritus, Atalanta falls for Hippomenes after her defeat by him, whereas in Ovid she is attracted to him before they race. Footraces were part of nuptial rites, particularly those for women and dedicated to Hera, the goddess of marriage, and athletic competitions with a maiden's hand in marriage as reward is a common motif in Greek myth, though usually in them it is the father, not the bride, who wrestles the suitors. The race contains parallels to hunting, and remarkably, it is Atalanta doing the hunting, while Hippomenes is the one being hunted, until she gives up, accepting marriage.

In ancient Greek culture, apples were seen as symbols of sexuality and fertility, sacred to both Hera and Aphrodite. The Greek word for apple, melon, also designated other round, apple-like fruits such as the pomegranate and the quince, which too were regarded and used as aphrodisiac tokens as seen in the myths of Persephone or Cydippe/Ctesylla, where the acceptance of the fruit seals the marriage.

Atalanta's refusal to marry means her eventual marriage is through conquest and defeat by the suitor, though their marriage is a wild one, as she continues to hunt in the wild.

=== Lions ===
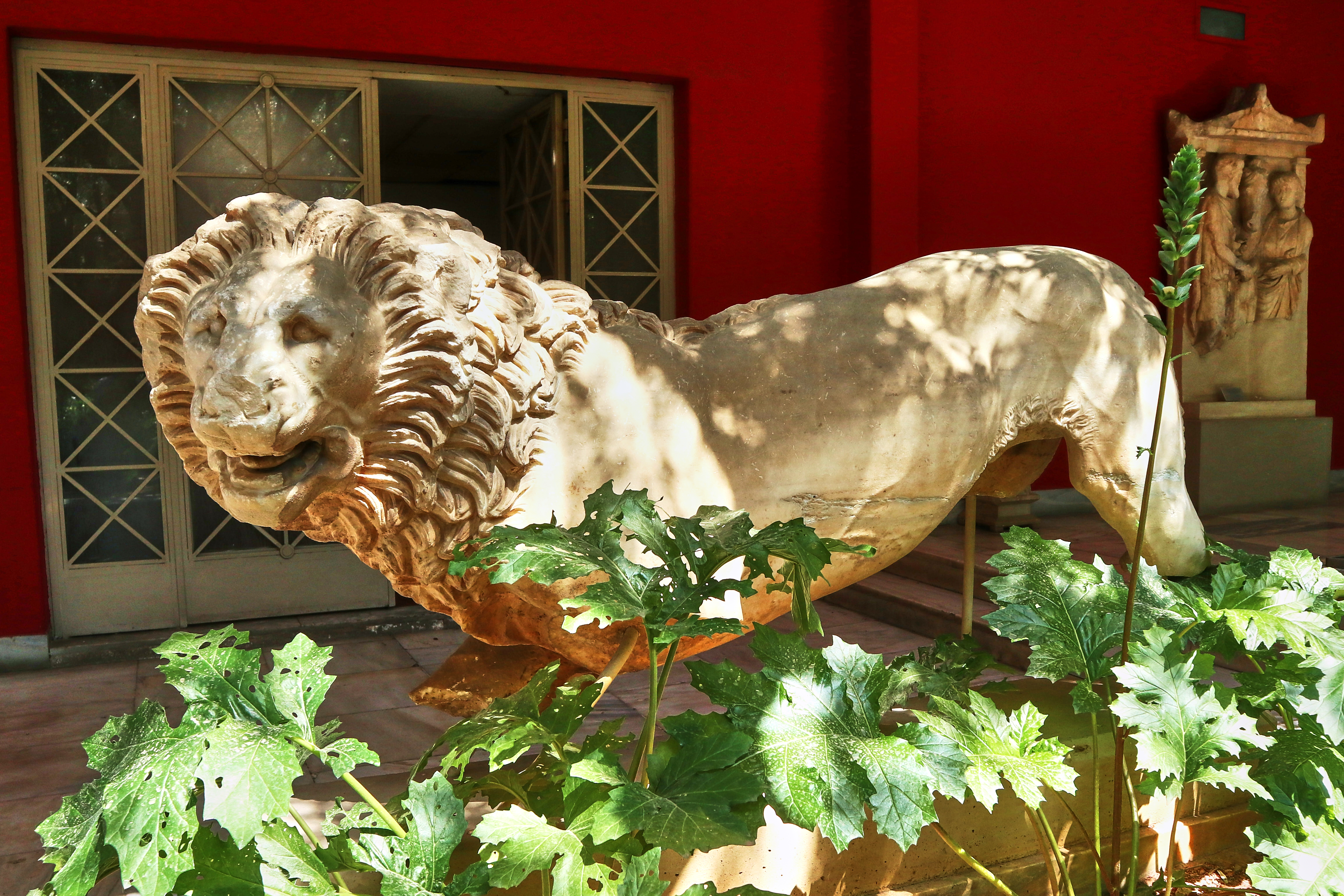
A 4th-century BC marble statue of a lion in the National Archaeological Museum, Greece.

As noted above, the myths regarding Atalanta came from both Boeotia and Arcadia, but which tradition sprang forth the lion myth, which features both Hippomenes and Melanion depeding on author, is hard to pin down; nevertheless the archaic footrace tradition is scarcely recorded, and the couple's fate in the early Boeotian version could have been different altogether.

Palaephatus tried to rationalise the myth by writing that they entered a lion cave and were killed by the lions, who then exited, making their hunting companions think they had been transformed into animals. First Hyginus (perhaps following Pliny), followed by other Latin authors, mentions the ancient belief that lions and lionesses could not mate, hence the punishment of the two lovers into animals hated by Aphrodite. The Cybele version might be a reference to this, as her other servants and priests were also sexless or castrated. Adrienne Mayor disagreed that the sexlessness of lions was a common misconception in ancient Greece, and interprents the transformation as a way for Atalanta and Hippomenes to live outside of Greek social and cultural expectations.

== See also ==
- Acontius
- Iðunn
- Apple of discord

== Bibliography ==
=== Primary sources ===
- Apollodorus, The Library, with an English Translation by Sir James George Frazer, F.B.A., F.R.S. in 2 Volumes. Cambridge, MA, Harvard University Press; London, William Heinemann Ltd. 1921. Online version at the Perseus Digital Library.
- Hesiod (1967). Merkelbach, Reinhold; West, Martin Litchfield (eds.). Fragmenta Hesiodea. Oxford University Press.
- Hyginus, Fabulae from The Myths of Hyginus translated and edited by Mary Grant. University of Kansas Publications in Humanistic Studies. Online version at the Topos Text Project.
- Nonnus, Dionysiaca; translated by Rouse, W H D, I Books I-XV. Loeb Classical Library No. 344, Cambridge, Massachusetts, Harvard University Press; London, William Heinemann Ltd. 1940. Internet Archive.
- Ovid, Art of Love. Cosmetics. Remedies for Love. Ibis. Walnut-tree. Sea Fishing. Consolation. Translated by J. H. Mozley. Revised by G. P. Goold. Loeb Classical Library 232. Cambridge, MA: Harvard University Press, 1929. Available online on Loeb Classical Library.
- Ovid, Metamorphoses translated by Brookes More (1859-1942). Boston, Cornhill Publishing Co. 1922. Online version at the Perseus Digital Library.
- Palaephatus, On Things not to be Believed, translated into English by John Brady Kiesling from the Greek text of N. Festa (Teubner 1902). A readable but not literal translation by Jacob Stern came out in 1996. Available online on Topos Text.
- Pausanias, Description of Greece with an English Translation by W.H.S. Jones, Litt.D., and H.A. Ormerod, M.A., in 4 Volumes. Cambridge, MA, Harvard University Press; London, William Heinemann Ltd. 1918. Online version at the Perseus Digital Library.
- Propertius, Elegies, edited and translated by G. P. Goold. Loeb Classical Library 18. Cambridge, MA: Harvard University Press, 1990. Available online at Loeb Classical Library.
- Servius, In Vergilii carmina comentarii. Servii Grammatici qui feruntur in Vergilii carmina commentarii; recensuerunt Georgius Thilo et Hermannus Hagen. Georgius Thilo. Leipzig. B. G. Teubner. 1881. Online version at the Perseus Digital Library.
- Theocritus, Idylls in Theocritus. Moschus. Bion, edited and translated by Neil Hopkinson. Loeb Classical Library 28. Cambridge, MA: Harvard University Press, 2015. Available online on Loeb Classical Library.
- Xenophon, On Hunting in Scripta Minora, translated by E. C. Marchant, G. W. Bowersock. Loeb Classical Library 183. Cambridge, MA: Harvard University Press, 1925. Available online at Loeb Classical Library.

=== Secondary sources ===
- Barringer, Judith M. (1996). "Atalanta as Model: The Hunter and the Hunted". Classical Antiquity. 15 (1).
- Bell, Robert E. (1991). Women of Classical Mythology: A Biographical Dictionary. ABC-Clio. ISBN 9780874365818.
- Cyrino, Monica S (2010). Aphrodite. Gods and Heroes of the Ancient World. New York and London: Routledge. ISBN 978-0-415-77523-6.
- Detienne, Marcel (1979). Dionysos Slain. Translated by Muellner, Mireille; Muellner, Leonard. The Johns Hopkins University Press. ISBN 0-8018-2210-6.
- Fontenrose, Joseph Eddy (1981). Orion: The Myth of the Hunter and the Huntress. CA, United States: University of California Press. ISBN 0-520-09632-0.
- Forbes Irving, Paul M. C. (1990). Metamorphosis in Greek Myths. Clarendon Press. ISBN 0-19-814730-9.
- Fowler, Robert L. (2000). Early Greek Mythography. Vol. 2: Commentary. Oxford, UK: Oxford University Press. ISBN 978-0-19-814741-1.
- Gantz, Timothy (1993). Early Greek Myth: A Guide to Literary and Artistic Sources. Vol. I. Johns Hopkins University Press. ISBN 978-0-8018-5360-9.
- Grimal, Pierre (1987). The Dictionary of Classical Mythology. Wiley-Blackwell. ISBN 0-631-13209-0.
- Hard, Robin (2004). The Routledge Handbook of Greek Mythology: Based on H. J. Rose's "Handbook of Greek Mythology". Routledge. ISBN 9780415186360.
- Heinze, Theodor (October 1, 2006). "Melanion". In Cancik, Hubert; Schneider, Helmuth (eds.). Brill's New Pauly. Translated by Christine F. Salazar. Geneva: Brill Reference Online. ISSN 1574-9347.
- Ormand, Kirk (2014). "Atalanta Reflects the Iliad". The Hesiodic Catalogue of Women and Archaic Greece. Cambridge University Press. ISBN 978-1-107-03519-5.
- Scherf, Johannes (October 1, 2006). "Hippomenes". In Cancik, Hubert; Schneider, Helmuth (eds.). Brill's New Pauly. Translated by Christine F. Salazar. Tübingen: Brill Reference Online. ISSN 1574-9347.
- Schmitz, Leonhard (1867). Smith, William (ed.). A Dictionary of Greek and Roman Biography and Mythology. London, UK: John Murray, printed by Spottiswoode and Co. Online version at the Perseus.tufts library.
