= Argeius =

Argeius (Ancient Greek: Ἀργεῖος, but also sometimes Argeus) was one of the Elean deputies sent to the Persian Empire to co-operate with Pelopidas in 367 BCE on counteracting Spartan negotiation and attaching Artaxerxes II of Persia to the Theban cause.

He is again mentioned by the writer Xenophon, in his account of the war between the Arcadians and Eleans in 365, as one of the leaders of the democratic party at Elis.

== Others ==
Several other lesser-known people also bear this name:

- Argeius, a (probably mythical) youth who competed at the ancient Nemean Games and Isthmian Games, recorded in the poems of Bacchylides.
- Argeuis, a sophist who taught at Pamphylia around the end of the 4th century. He is believed to have been a pupil of Libanius.
- Argeius, a mythical centaur who was driven mad by the smell of wine and subsequently killed by the demigod Heracles while the latter was visiting his friend, the centaur Pholus, some time between his third and fourth labors.
- Argeius, a son of the mythological king and queen of Pisa and 'master of horses' Hippodamia and her husband Pelops.
- Argeius, one of the mythological Niobids, according to the Scholiast on Euripides.
- Argeius, son of Deiphontes, king of Argos, by his wife Hyrnetho.
- Argeius, a (mythological) king of Argos around 1600 BCE, and successor to Apis, king of Argos, according to Tatian.
