= Melanion (son of Amphidamas) =

Arcadian man in Greek mythology

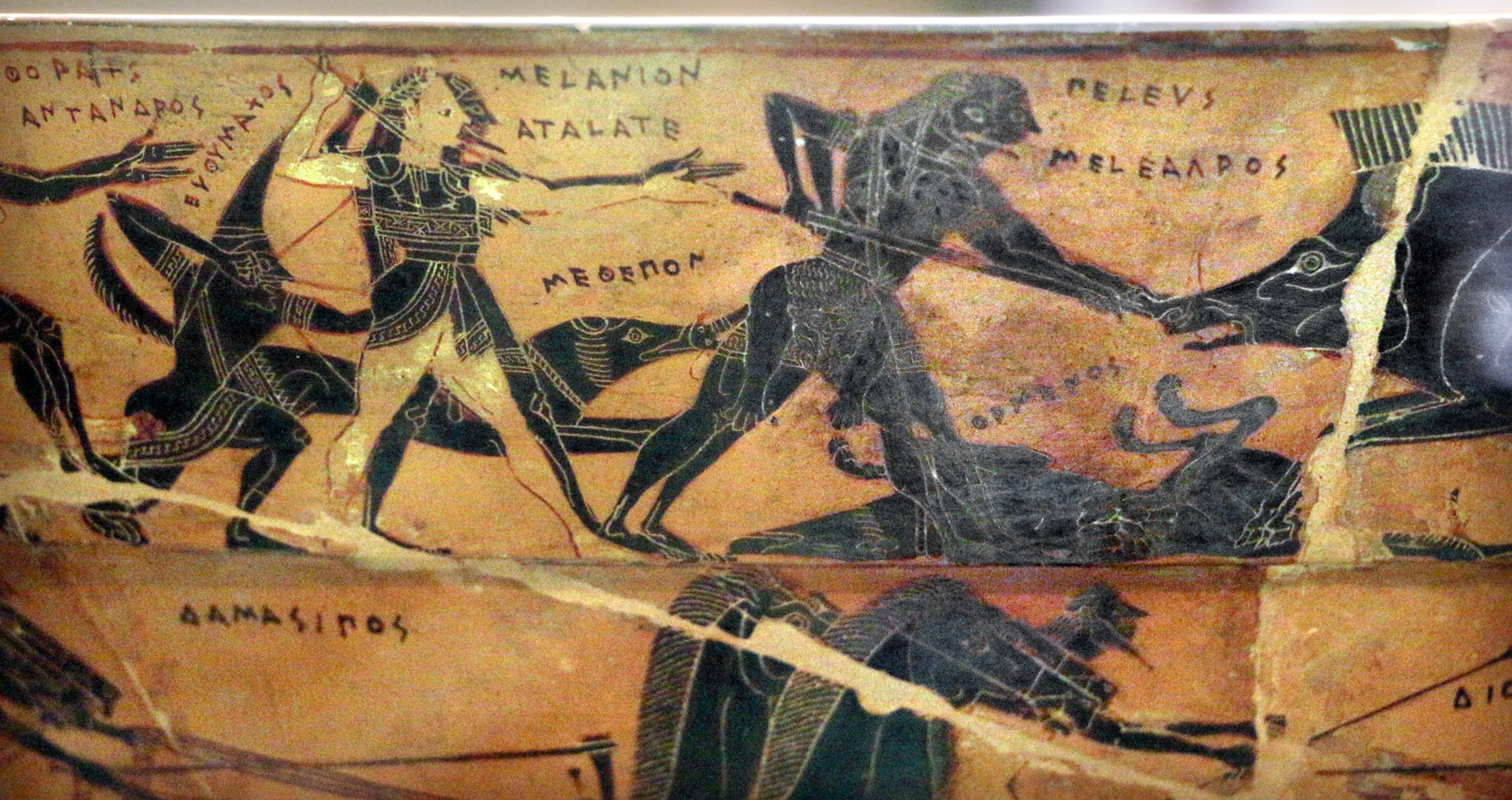
Atalanta and Melanion hunting the Calydonian boar on the François Vase c. 570 BC, National Archaeological Museum of Florence.

In Greek mythology, Melanion (Ancient Greek: Μελανίων, romanized: Melaníōn, lit. 'black one' or 'dark one') or Milanion (Ancient Greek: Μειλανίων, romanized: Meilaníōn) is an Arcadian prince who married Atalanta, the fearsome huntress who killed the Calydonian boar. In ancient sources Melanion is often conflated with Atalanta's husband Hippomenes, but is not entirely interchangeable with him, and the two likely originated from independent traditions.

== Family ==
Melanion was the son of Amphidamas, a prince of Arcadia, and so the brother of Antimache. Amphidamas was the brother of Iasus, Atalanta's father in the Arcadian version, making Melanion and his wife first cousins.

== Atalanta and her husband ==
The Boeotian story of Atalanta and Hippomenes' footrace, already recorded in the archaic poem Catalogue of Women, goes that Atalanta only accepted to marry the man who would beat her in a footrace. Hippomenes was no match for her speed, but he was given three golden apples by love-goddess Aphrodite that he dropped on three occasions during the footrace; each time Atalanta halted to pick up the apple, losing time and allowing Hippomenes to overtake her and take the victory and her hand in marriage. But he neglected to properly thank Aphrodite for her support, so some time later she inspired uncontrollable lust in them and the two had sex inside a temple dedicated to Zeus or Cybele, so the offended deity transformed them both into lions.

One of the earliest accounts for Melanion's story is Aristophanes' comedic play Lysistrata, which differs significantly from other accounts. In it, the male chorus says that Melanion avoided marriage and withdrew to the mountains, hunting wild game with nets he wove and never returning home out of hatred for women. Although there could be some lesser-known narrative where Melanion was more like the Euripidean Hippolytus, the male chorus could be twisting the tale to make a point.

In some versions the Arcadian Melanion supplants the Boeotian Hippomenes as the man who marries Atalanta in spite of her wilfully avoiding marriage, although his way of wooing the maiden is often overlooked by ancient testimonies. Melanion is sometimes presented as the winner of the footrace. As a hunter who avoided marriage, Melanion can be seen as a male counterpart to Atalanta.

== Sources ==
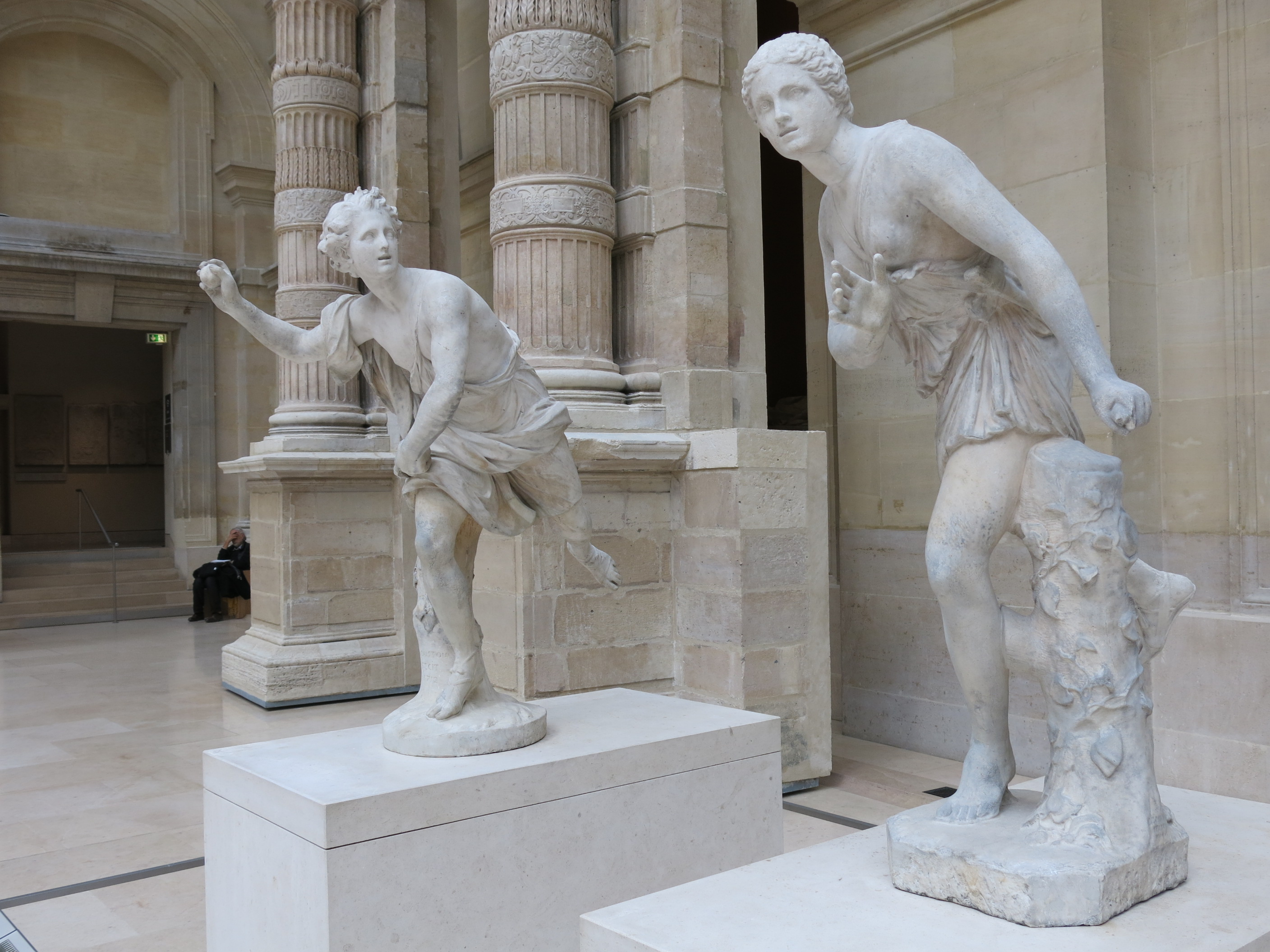
Sculptural group of the footrace of Hippomenes and Atalanta by Guillaume Coustou in the Louvre Museum in Paris, France.

Fifth-century BC historian Xenophon says that Melanion was a pupil of Chiron, and that he succeeded in getting Atalanta with 'great labour', while Ovid and Propertius write that he followed her around, battling wild beasts and carrying her nets while she hunted and even suffering a wound by Hylaeus (the centaur who harassed Atalanta), evidently a figure distinct from Hippomenes and one who won Atalanta's heart through devotion rather than competition. It is Apollodorus in the second century the first one to name the winner of the footrace Melanion rather than Hippomenes. Likewise, the first known attestation of the lion metamorphosis myth comes from fourth-century BC writer Palaephatus, who uses Melanion for Atalanta's husband's name, but says no word about the actual myth's details. In the rationalising account of Palaephatus, the two entered a lion couple's cave and were killed by them, but when the two lions exited the cave, Melanion's companions thought that he and Atalanta had transformed into animals.

Atalanta herself is hypothised to be the amalgamation of two heroines, one Boeotian with a footrace myth, and one Arcadian who hunted the Calydonian Boar along with Meleager, which explains the discrepancy of the identity of the successful suitor turned husband. It is not clear whether two distinct Atalantas came to be conflated, or an original singular Atalanta diverged into two main ways and was unified again later. Detienne, Fontenrose and Forbes Irving disagreed that the two Atalantas needed a distinction at all, as both girls are described as excelling in masculine activities and geography is one of the elements where myths can vary. In accordance, Hippomenes is commonly the husband in the Boeotian tradition, and Melanion in the Arcadian one. Although Hippomenes never plays a role outside the Boeotian myth, Melanion is sometimes included in the myth of the Calydonian boar hunt, as the François Vase depicts him hunting side-by-side with Atalanta, perhaps meant to be understood as his already wedded wife. Two ancient Greek inscriptions mention him as one of the Calydonian boar hunters.

Furthermore, Melanion in some sources was said to be the father of Atalanta's son Parthenopaeus, himself an Arcadian native who joined the seven against Thebes. Although some versions make him a son of Ares or Meleager, Hippomenes, unlike Melanion, is never the father.

== Iconography ==
According to the traveller Pausanias, one of the scenes depicted on the chest that Cypselus dedicated at Olympia was Atalanta holding a deer standing next to Melanion. A fragmentary dinos excavated in the ancient agora of Athens depicts Atalanta in the presence of a man whose name starts with 'Mel-' and has been identified with Melanion, although Meleager is another possibility.

== See also ==
- Cyanippus, a Thessalian hunter
- Siproites, a hunter from Crete
- Orion, who pursued nymphs devoted to Artemis

== Bibliography ==
- Apollodorus, The Library, with an English Translation by Sir James George Frazer, F.B.A., F.R.S. in 2 Volumes. Cambridge, MA, Harvard University Press; London, William Heinemann Ltd. 1921. Online version at the Perseus Digital Library.
- Barringer, Judith M. (1996). "Atalanta as Model: The Hunter and the Hunted". Classical Antiquity. 15 (1).
- Bell, Robert E. (1991). Women of Classical Mythology: A Biographical Dictionary. ABC-Clio. ISBN 9780874365818.
- Detienne, Marcel (1979). Dionysos Slain. Translated by Muellner, Mireille; Muellner, Leonard. The Johns Hopkins University Press. ISBN 0-8018-2210-6.
- Fontenrose, Joseph Eddy (1981). Orion: The Myth of the Hunter and the Huntress. CA, United States: University of California Press. ISBN 0-520-09632-0.
- Forbes Irving, Paul M. C. (1990). Metamorphosis in Greek Myths. Clarendon Press. ISBN 0-19-814730-9.
- Fowler, Robert L. (2000). Early Greek Mythography. Vol. 2: Commentary. Oxford, UK: Oxford University Press. ISBN 978-0-19-814741-1.
- Gantz, Timothy (1993). Early Greek Myth: A Guide to Literary and Artistic Sources. Vol. I. Johns Hopkins University Press. ISBN 978-0-8018-5360-9.
- Grimal, Pierre (1987). The Dictionary of Classical Mythology. Wiley-Blackwell. ISBN 0-631-13209-0.
- Hard, Robin (2004). The Routledge Handbook of Greek Mythology: Based on H. J. Rose's "Handbook of Greek Mythology". Routledge. ISBN 9780415186360.
- Harder, Ruth Elisabeth (October 1, 2006). "Atalante". In Cancik, Hubert; Schneider, Helmuth (eds.). Brill's New Pauly. Translated by Christine F. Salazar. Zürich: Brill Reference Online. ISSN 1574-9347.
- Heinze, Theodor (October 1, 2006). "Melanion". In Cancik, Hubert; Schneider, Helmuth (eds.). Brill's New Pauly. Translated by Christine F. Salazar. Geneva: Brill Reference Online. ISSN 1574-9347.
- Ovid, Art of Love. Cosmetics. Remedies for Love. Ibis. Walnut-tree. Sea Fishing. Consolation. Translated by J. H. Mozley. Revised by G. P. Goold. Loeb Classical Library 232. Cambridge, MA: Harvard University Press, 1929. Available online on Loeb Classical Library.
- Palaephatus, On Things not to be Believed (ΠΕΡΙ ΑΠΙΣΤΩΝ, De incredibilibus). Translated by John Brady Kiesling (1957- ) from the Greek text of N. Festa (Teubner 1902). A readable but not literal translation by Jacob Stern came out in 1996. Available online on Topos Text.
- Pausanias, Description of Greece with an English Translation by W.H.S. Jones, Litt.D., and H.A. Ormerod, M.A., in 4 Volumes. Cambridge, MA, Harvard University Press; London, William Heinemann Ltd. 1918. Online version at the Perseus Digital Library.
- Propertius, Elegies, edited and translated by G. P. Goold. Loeb Classical Library 18. Cambridge, MA: Harvard University Press, 1990. Available online at Loeb Classical Library.
- Servius, In Vergilii carmina comentarii. Servii Grammatici qui feruntur in Vergilii carmina commentarii; recensuerunt Georgius Thilo et Hermannus Hagen. Georgius Thilo. Leipzig. B. G. Teubner. 1881. Online version at the Perseus Digital Library.
- Storey, Ian C., ed. (2024). Aristophanes: Lysistrata, Women at the Thesmophoria, Frogs. Translated by Arnson Svarlien, Diane. US: Hackett Publishing, Inc. ISBN 978-1-64792-185-9.
- Schmitz, Leonhard (1867). Smith, William (ed.). A Dictionary of Greek and Roman Biography and Mythology. London, UK: John Murray, printed by Spottiswoode and Co. Online version at the Perseus.tufts library.
- Xenophon, On Hunting in Scripta Minora, translated by E. C. Marchant, G. W. Bowersock. Loeb Classical Library 183. Cambridge, MA: Harvard University Press, 1925. Available online at Loeb Classical Library.
