= Halitherses =

Ithacan prophet in the Odyssey

In Greek mythology, Halitherses /ˌhælɪˈθɜːrˌsiːz/ (Ancient Greek: Ἁλιθέρσης), son of Mastor, was an Ithacan prophet who warned the suitors of Penelope after interpreting the symbols that Zeus sent to "be wise in time, and put a stop to this wickedness before he comes." The suitors do not heed Halitherses' warning. After the suitors all die, Halitherses warns the suitors' families against action against Odysseus, saying they will bring evil on their heads for this action against the gods' will. Only half of them listen. The suitors' families go on to try to kill Odysseus's family, but they are thwarted by the goddess Athena. Halitherses was one of Odysseus' dear friends back in Ithaca, along with Mentor. Both Halitherses and Mentor tried to stop the suitors but were unable to. However, Penelope remained faithful to Odysseus.

== See also ==
- The Odyssey
