= Deiphontes =

Mythical character

Deiphontes (/diː.ɪˈfɒntiːz/; Ancient Greek: Δηϊφόντης) was king of Argos. He was a son of Antimachus, and husband of Hyrnetho, the daughter of Temenus the Heracleide, by whom he became the father of Antimenes, Xanthippus, Argeius, and Orsobia. Deiphontes was descended from Ctesippus, the son of Heracles by Deianira.

== Reign ==
When Temenus, in the division of Peloponnesos, had obtained Argos as his share, he bestowed all his affections upon daughter Hyrnetho and her husband Deiphontes. His sons, who had reason to fear he would appoint him his successor, are said to have hired the Titans to murder their father. According to the Bibliotheca, after the death of Temenus, the army, abhorring the parricides, declared Deiphontes and Hyrnetho his rightful successors.

Pausanias, however, reports a different story. According to him, after Temenus's death it was not Deiphontes that succeeded him, but Ceisus. Deiphontes, on the other hand, is said to have lived at Epidaurus, whither he went with the army which was attached to him, and from whence he expelled the Ionian king, Pityreus. His brothers-in-law, however, who begrudged him the possession of their sister Hyrnetho, went to Epidaurus, and tried to persuade her to leave her husband; and when this attempt failed, they carried her off by force. Deiphontes pursued them, and after having killed one of them, Cerynes, he wrestled with the other, Phalces, who held his sister in his arms. In this struggle, Hyrnetho was unintentionally killed by her own brother, who then escaped. Deiphontes carried her body back to Epidaurus, and there erected a sanctuary to her.

== Decline and end of monarchy at Argos ==
From this time the royal prerogative began to lose ground very fast. To Ceisus or Cisus succeeded Lacidamus, who had little else than the title of a king. His son Meltas, impatient of such restraint, endeavored, when it was too late, to restore it to its ancient dignity; but the people were by that time grown so powerful and headstrong, that, as soon as they found out his design, they put an effectual stop to it, and an end to kingly power, reducing the government into a democracy, and condemning their unhappy prince to death.

== Sources ==
- Apollodorus, 2.8.5
- Pausanias, 2.26.2, 2.28.3

== Notes ==
Regnal titles
Preceded by Temenus	King of Argos	Succeeded by Ceisus
