= Leimone =

Leimone (Λειμώνη) or Leimonis (Λειμωνίς) was, in an Ancient Athenian legend, the daughter of Hippomenes, a descendant of King Codrus. When her father caught her having illicit sex, he killed her lover and locked her in an empty house together with a horse. The animal eventually came to be starving and devoured Leimone. The remains of that house were still extant in the times of Aeschines, and the place was known as "At the Horse and the Maiden".

== Sources ==
- Grimal, Pierre. A Concise Dictionary of Classical Mythology. Basil Blackwell Ltd, 1990. - p. 242
- Lyons, Deborah. Gender and Immortality: Appendix - A Catalogue of Heroines. Princeton University Press, 1996 . - under Leimone
- Wilhelm Heinrich Roscher (ed.): Ausführliches Lexikon der griechischen und römischen Mythologie. Band 2.2 (L-M), Leipzig, 1894–1897. - s. 1934
