= Cisus =

King of Argos in Greek mythology

In Greek mythology, Cisus, (or Ceisus), son of Temenus, was a king of Argos.

Temenus had initially left his kingdom to his son in law, Deiphontes, despite having natural sons of his own. As a result, Deiphontes was slain through the stratagems of the sons of Temenus. The eldest son, Cisus, succeeded him and took possession of the kingdom.

By this time, however, the Argives became advocates for liberty of speech and laws of their own making, which greatly diminished the power of their king so much that by the end of his reign, Cisus had become a king in name only. He was succeeded by Lacidaus.

== Sources ==
- Bibliotheca 2.8.5
- Pausanias, 2.26.2, 2.28.3

Regnal titles
Preceded by Deiphontes	King of Argos	Succeeded by Lacidaus
