= Iphito =

In Greek mythology, Iphito was an Amazon who served under Hippolyte. Her name is only known from inscriptions.
