= Areto =

Amazon in Greek mythology

In Greek mythology, Areto (Ancient Greek: Ἀρετώ "virtuous") was an Amazon.

Her name is not attested in literary sources, and is known solely from an Attic black-figure vase painting.
