= Bouzyges =

Mythical Athenian inventor of plowing

Bouzyges (Ancient Greek: Βουζύγης, romanized: Bouzygēs, lit. 'Ox-yoker') is a culture hero from Greek mythology, credited with the invention of many agricultural practices; most notably, he was the first man to yoke oxen to a plough and introduced cultivation to Athens. He has sometimes been identified or confused with Epimenides, who visited and purified Athens.

He appeared in Athenian literature in the 6th century BC, and Lasus of Hermione, the 6th century BC poet, mentioned him.

The only ancient depiction of him is on a krater, attributed to the painter of the Naples Hephaistos, showing a nude, bearded Bouzyges driving two bulls (or a bull and an ox) pulling the first plough. The krater was part of a bequest of David Moore Robinson to the collection of the Fogg Museum, part of the Harvard Art Museums.

The name was also used by an order of priests associated with the Eleusinian Mysteries; these priests, collectively known as the Bouzygai, were also the priests of Zeus at the Palladium and Zeus Teleios. They also served as priests elsewhere, such as Ilissus.

Bouzygai could also refer to the clan that claimed descent from Bouzyges. At an annual festival celebrated in his honor at the foot of the Acropolis, a member of the family performed a sacred ploughing rite. At a ceremony for Demeter in Athens, a member was tasked with cursing those who violated certain norms of "good-neighbourliness" that were not otherwise punishable by law. It is said that Pericles may have been one of the Bouzygai. However, some scholars dispute this, suggesting that this clan is an inferior counterpart of the Athenian statesman.
