= Dorian invasion =

Greek myth and discredited archaeological theory

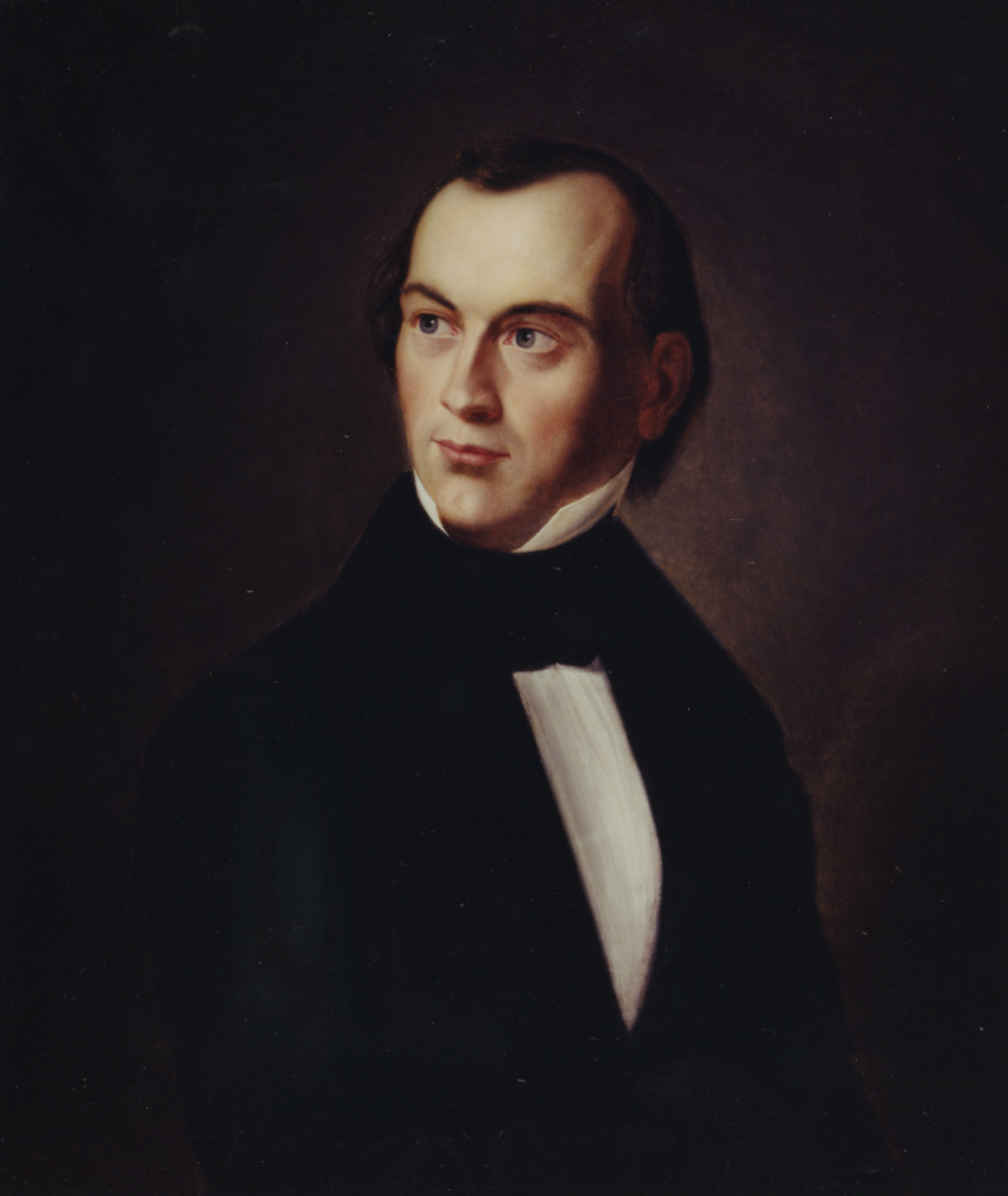
Karl Otfried Müller, painted by Wilhelm Ternite in 1838. Müller popularised the ancient myth of the Dorian invasion in modern archaeology, and within German nationalism and pseudoscientific race theory.

The Dorian invasion (or Dorian migration) is an ancient Greek myth and discredited archaeological hypothesis describing the movement of the Dorian people into the Peloponnese region of Greece. According to the myth, the Dorians migrated from central Greece shortly after the Trojan War and populated most of the southern Peloponnese, particularly the regions of Laconia, Messenia and the Argolid. The myth became combined with that of the Return of the Heracleidae, such that the descendants of the hero Heracles were imagined to have led the Dorians and founded the ruling lines of several Dorian cities, including Sparta. The myth probably emerged during the Early Iron Age as part of a process of ethnogenesis between cities claiming Dorian ancestry. In the fifth century BCE, it gained greater prominence through its use to promote unity among Sparta's Peloponnesian allies, and to differentiate Sparta from its rival Athens, believed to be of Ionian heritage.

In 1824, the German antiquarian Karl Otfried Müller published The Dorians, in which he argued that the Dorians were a northern, Indo-European people who invaded Greece and subjugated the Peloponnese. Müller's views gained general scholarly acceptance throughout the remainder of the nineteenth century and into the twentieth. The Dorians were credited with introducing new forms of material culture and destroying the Mycenaean palaces, though this created conflicts between the interpretative narrative, the mythological tradition, and the archaeological evidence. The Dorians also became associated with the Sea Peoples, believed to have destroyed several Near Eastern sites at the end of the Bronze Age. During the first half of the twentieth century, scholars attempted to find archaeological and linguistic evidence of the Dorian invasion and to trace its route, though these efforts proved largely unsuccessful.

Müller and his successors, such as Ernst Curtius, considered the Dorians to have been racially and culturally superior to the peoples whom they replaced. German nationalists, following Hermann Müller, portrayed the Dorians as belonging to a Nordic race, and so being fundamentally Germanic in character. The Dorian invasion became connected with the romanticisation of ancient Sparta, and was used to assert a special connection between Prussia and ancient Greece. During the Nazi period, the association between the Dorians and the Aryans became a matter of orthodoxy, and high-ranking Nazis, including Adolf Hitler, integrated the Dorian invasion into their pseudoscientific theories of race. Racialised views of the Dorians remained common in scholarship, both inside and outside Germany, until the 1960s.

Although Müller's narrative of the Dorian invasion received early challenges, particularly from Karl Julius Beloch in 1893, it was only rarely questioned until the decipherment of the Mycenaean Linear B script in 1952. Archaeological discoveries in the 1960s demonstrated that the cultural innovations previously ascribed to the Dorians were spread over a long period, often showing continuity from Bronze Age Mycenaean civilisation, and often arose in regions, such as Attica and Euboea, believed to have been unaffected by the invasion. Throughout the 1980s and 1990s, academic belief in the Dorian invasion declined, to the point where it was generally accepted as a myth. Modern archaeologists explain the collapse of Mycenaean palatial civilisation through factors including social conflicts, climate change, technological developments and the breakdown of the palaces' socio-economic model. Population movements at the end of the Bronze Age are believed to have been relatively small in scale and generally to have been directed away from, rather than towards, the southern Peloponnese.

== Classical period ==
Distribution of the major dialects of Ancient Greek within the Aegean region and Cyprus, c. 500 – c. 323 BCE

In the classical period (that is, from c. 600 BCE), the Dorians were an ethno-linguistic group, speaking the Doric dialect of Greek, concentrated in the southern Peloponnese, Crete, Sicily and the Dodecanese. Several cultural forms were identified as "Dorian" in classical times, such as the Doric order of architecture, the Dorian mode in music, and the Doric dialect. These were not exclusive to communities considered Dorian, some of which used other linguistic dialects: Halicarnassus, for instance, was considered a Dorian city into the Hellenistic period (323–30 BCE), but used Ionic for official inscriptions from the fifth century BCE and may never have widely spoken Doric. (Note: Hall 2006, p. 241; Cook 1962, pp. 21–22 (on the use of Doric). See, on the Dorian status of Halicarnassus, Priestley 2014, pp. 31–33.) The Doric dialect itself was diverse and closely related to other varieties of Greek, and may not have originated from a single proto-dialect.

The ancient Greeks considered the Dorians to have migrated to the Peloponnese from central Greece, (Note: Thucydides places the Dorians' original homeland in Doris, while Herodotus places it in Phthiotis.) led by the descendants of the hero Heracles (the Heracleidae), around the end of the age of heroes (roughly the Late Bronze Age or the late second millennium BCE), shortly after the Trojan War. The myth appears to have originated in the Argolid or in Sparta at the end of the Early Iron Age, (Note: Allan 2001, p. 25; Kennell 2010, p. 23 (for Sparta); Hall 1997, p. 62; Luraghi 2008, p. 53 (for the Argolid).) and to have combined earlier mythic traditions concerning the Dorians and the Heracleidae. Two further Dorian migrations were believed to have occurred: the first resulted in the foundation of Doric colonies in the southern Aegean and in Asia Minor, while the second, in the eighth century BCE, established Doric-speaking communities at Cyrene and in Magna Graecia. At least initially, the stories of the Dorian migration and the Return of the Heracleidae formed separate traditions, which were combined by the time of Herodotus (that is, the mid-fifth century BCE) at the latest. By the late fifth century BCE, Greeks considered the Dorian invasion a major turning point in their history, and it was reckoned as the beginning of the main line of historical continuity for Dorian states in the Peloponnese.

The earliest surviving attestation of the myth is in the work of the seventh-century BCE Spartan poet Tyrtaeus. (Note: Allan 2001, p. 23 and Hall 2006, p. 241, both citing Tyrtaeus, fragment 2.) The term used for the Heraclidae's return by Herodotus is kathodos, which can mean both "descent" and "return from exile". By the sixth century BCE, the ethnic divisions between the Heracleidae and the Dorians were often elided, such that the Heracleidae and Heracles himself were often imagined to be Dorians, and the Dorian invasion of the Peloponnese to be a homeward journey. Similarly, the term "Return of the Heracleidae" was often used to refer to the Dorian migration into that region. The most complete surviving accounts of the myth are those of the first-century BCE historian Diodorus Siculus and the Bibliotheca, a mythological compendium dating to the first or second century CE, but these probably followed earlier sources closely. It was also alluded to by the Theban poet Pindar, who wrote in the early fifth century BCE.

=== As a foundation myth ===
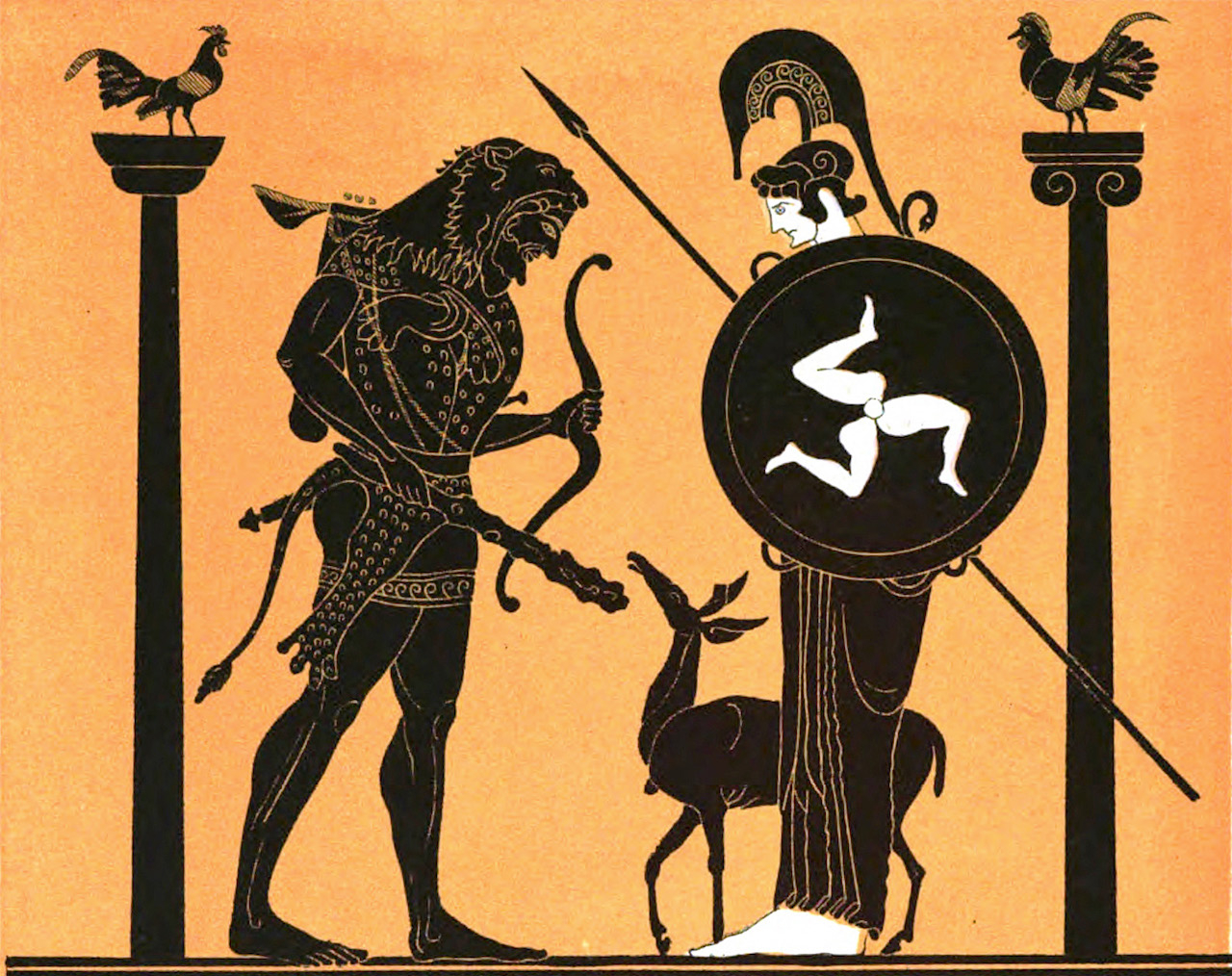
Drawing by Eduard Gerhard of a late sixth-century BCE Greek amphora, showing Heracles (left) with Athena. Behind Heracles is a column of the Doric order; behind Athena is one of the Ionic order, showing the association between Heracles and Dorian identity.

The narrative of the Dorian invasion was particularly important in Sparta, where it formed the city's foundation myth. Tyrtaeus wrote of the Spartans as Dorians, who arrived in the land of Laconia from Erineus, in Doris, with the Heracleidae. There, Zeus and Hera granted Sparta to the Heracleidae: (Note: Hall 2006, p. 241, citing Tyrtaeus, fragment 2.) the two Spartan royal lines – the Agiad and Eurypontid dynasties – claimed descent from Heracles into the classical period. The version of the invasion narrative used in Sparta seems to have been a pastiche of various myths, with only a tenuous connection to the ancient Greeks' understanding of the Dorians as a people: the historian Nigel Kennell has called it "drastically underwritten" and likely to have developed in Laconia itself. Functionally, the story of the Dorian invasion, in conjunction with the story of the Heracleidae, served to assert Sparta's right to its territory in the Peloponnese, both in Laconia and in Messenia.

In Messenia itself, a version of the myth held that the Dorians had killed the Heraclid Kresphontes, who was allotted the kingdom after the initial Heraclid contest. After the restoration of Messenian independence by Epaminondas of Thebes in 370 BCE, this latter version was emphasised, and the newly founded tribes of Messenia were given the names of Heracles's descendants rather than the traditional names of the Dorian tribal groups of the region. Nino Luraghi interprets this as a means of breaking the perceived links between Messenia and Sparta: the latter was considered, in his words, "the quintessence of Dorianism".

Sparta used the myth of the Dorian invasion to justify the Tanagra campaign of 457, in which they sent troops to fight on behalf of Doris against an invasion from Phocis, an ally of Sparta's enemy Athens. During the Peloponnesian War between Athens and Sparta at the end of the fifth century BCE, Sparta asserted kinship with its Peloponnesian allies through a claim of common Dorian heritage. Around the reign of the Roman emperor Hadrian (r. 117–138 CE), Sparta underwent a campaign of reasserting itself as the quintessential Dorian city, including efforts to re-establish what were considered primordial Doric cultural forms, including the "hyperdoricisation" of its dialect. A reference in the work of the second-century CE geographer Pausanias, where the Messenians appeal to the Spartans on the basis of their shared Dorian ancestry during the Second Messenian War in the seventh century BCE, is unlikely to be historical. (Note: Hall 2002, p. 57, citing Pausanias, 4.8.2.)

== Modern archaeological hypothesis ==
=== Origins ===
Early archaeological work in the nineteenth century gave the impression of a substantial break between the Bronze Age and the Early Iron Age in Greece. This was considered to be marked by the introduction of new material culture, specifically bronze violin-bow fibulae, a new sword of the Naue II type, cremation, cist graves, and – of most importance – ironworking. These cultural changes were associated with the arrival of newcomers, and those newcomers named as the Dorians. Destruction layers at Mycenaean palatial sites were then attributed to this putative invasion, even though such destruction went unmentioned in ancient accounts of Dorian origins.

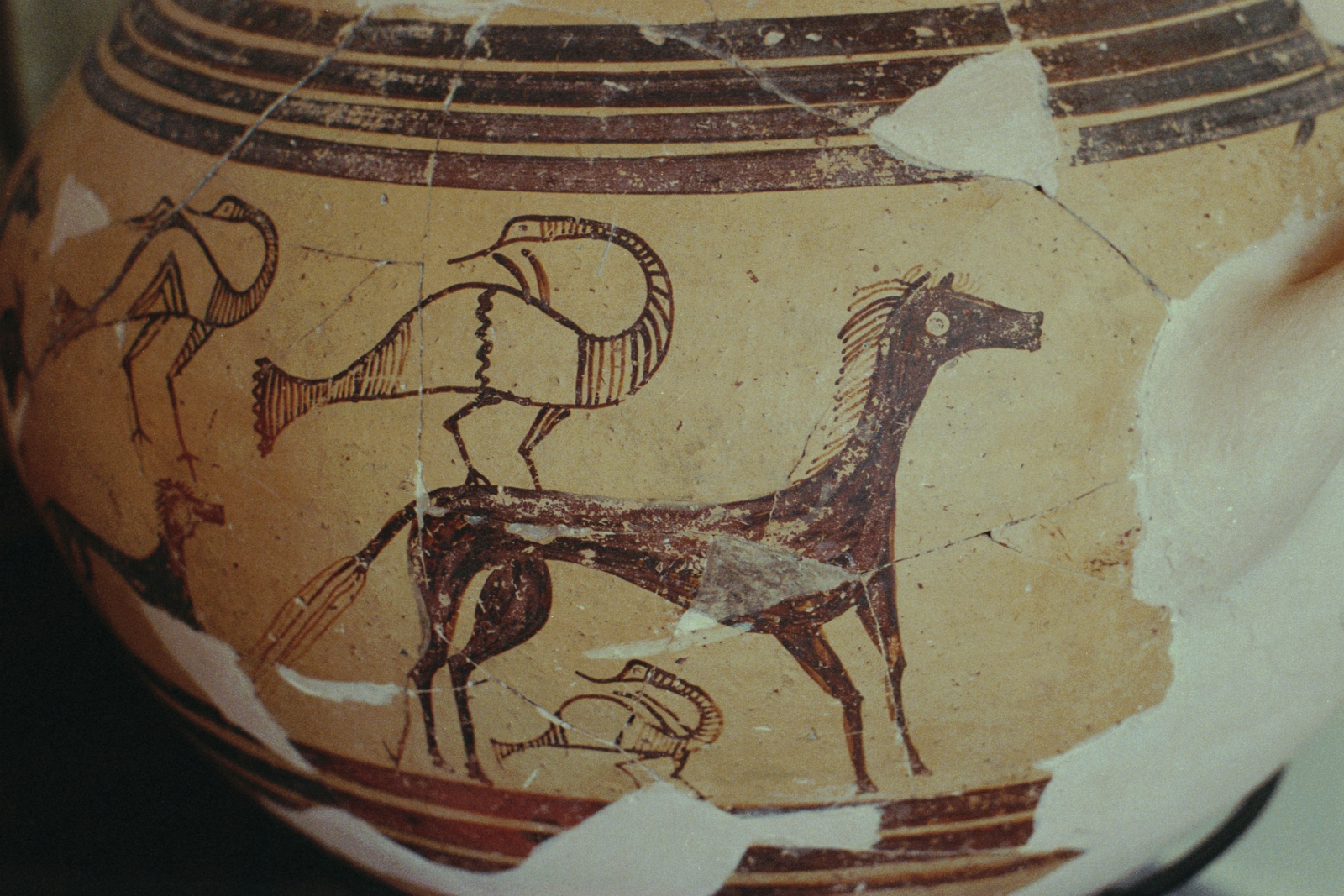
Painted vessel from Mycenae, late 12th century BCE

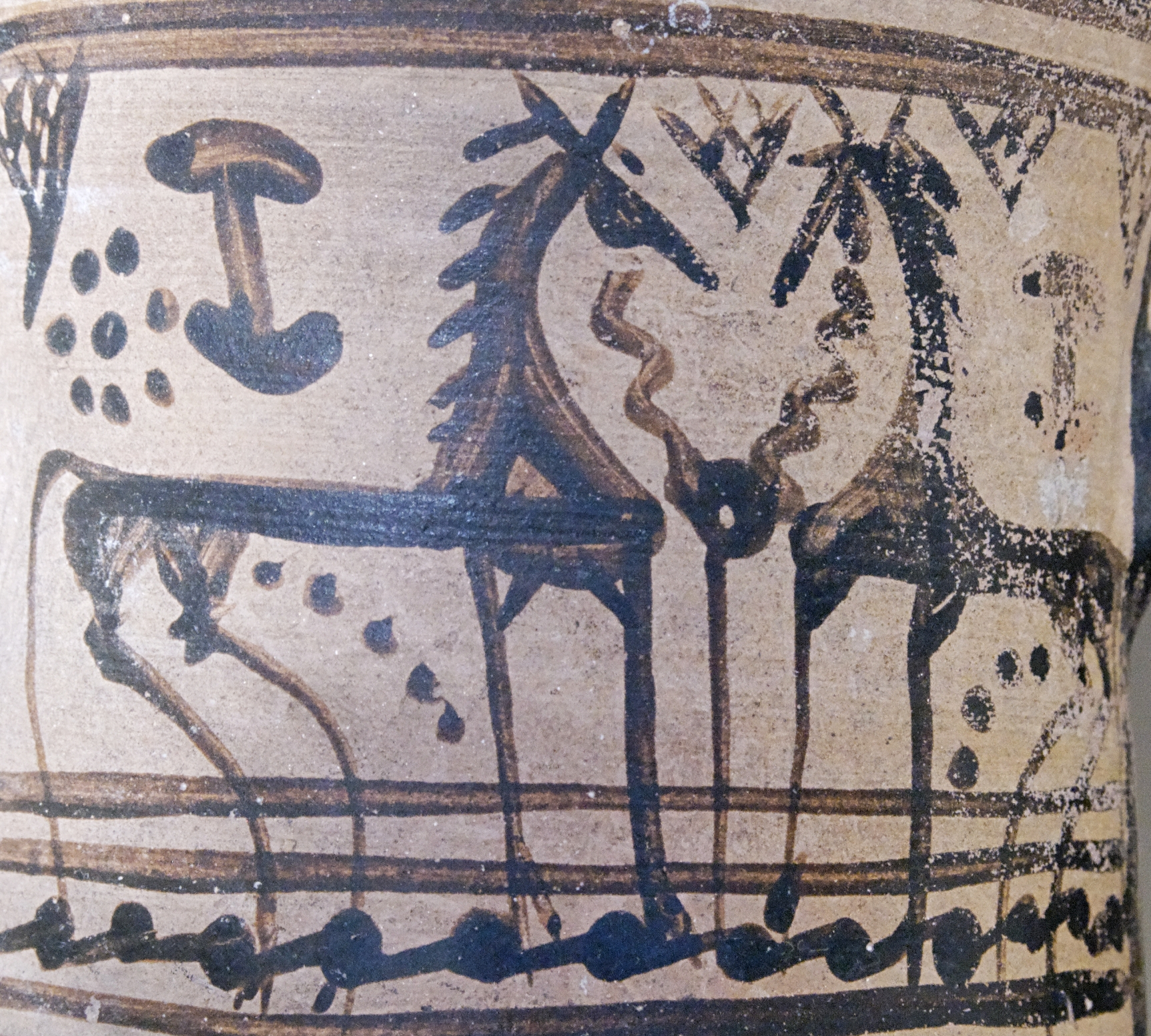
Geometric amphora from Argos, 8th century BCE

In 1824, Karl Otfried Müller published The Dorians (Die Dorier). He argued that the Dorians were a northern, Indo-European (in German, indogermanisch) people who invaded Greece and subjugated the Peloponnese. He characterised the Dorians as a "young race", superior in their individual characters, their political organisation, and their language. A student of Müller's, Ernst Curtius, called them "northern mountaineers", stronger than the coastal peoples of Greece due to what he saw as their vigour born of a comparative lack of development and civilisation. In the nineteenth and early twentieth centuries, the Dorians were imagined as an Aryan people, in line with other similar hypotheses about northern or Aryan invaders in the Near East. Hermann Müller argued in 1844 for the Nordic origin of Dorian (and so classical Greek) civilisation: this view became the standard in German historiography and remained so until the mid-twentieth century.

In 1870, Alexander Conze proposed that the recently identified Geometric style of pottery was the work of Dorian invaders, whom he considered to be a Germanic people from northern Europe. This view became the most popular scholarly interpretation of Geometric pottery for the remainder of the nineteenth century, though early objections noted the continuity between Mycenaean and Geometric styles and that Geometric pottery originated in Attica, which was not affected by the Dorian invasion in the mythological tradition; competing hypotheses developed that Geometric pottery was in fact a "peasant style", originally predating Mycenaean culture, that it represented a mixture of northern-European styles with those of the Mycenaean period, or that it had in fact been brought from the Near East by the Phoenicians. Later, the Geometric style was divided from its earlier manifestation, the Protogeometric, used until the ninth century BCE; the Protogeometric was also argued to be Dorian in origin.

The paradigm of the Dorian invasion spread from German into British and French scholarship, though its tenets were rarely debated or developed outside France and Germany. Influential scholars such as William Ridgeway, Ernst Grumach and Sinclair Hood saw the ancient myths of the Dorian invasion and the Heracleidae as reflecting a historical migration of Aryan Dorians into Greece, although this interpretation conflicted with both ancient testimony and the understanding that the earlier Mycenaeans were themselves Greek. In France, Victor Duruy linked the Dorian invasion to the autocratic nature of the Spartan state, suggesting that it made Sparta ethnically homogeneous and so more acquiescent to repressive government.

=== Development and widespread adoption ===
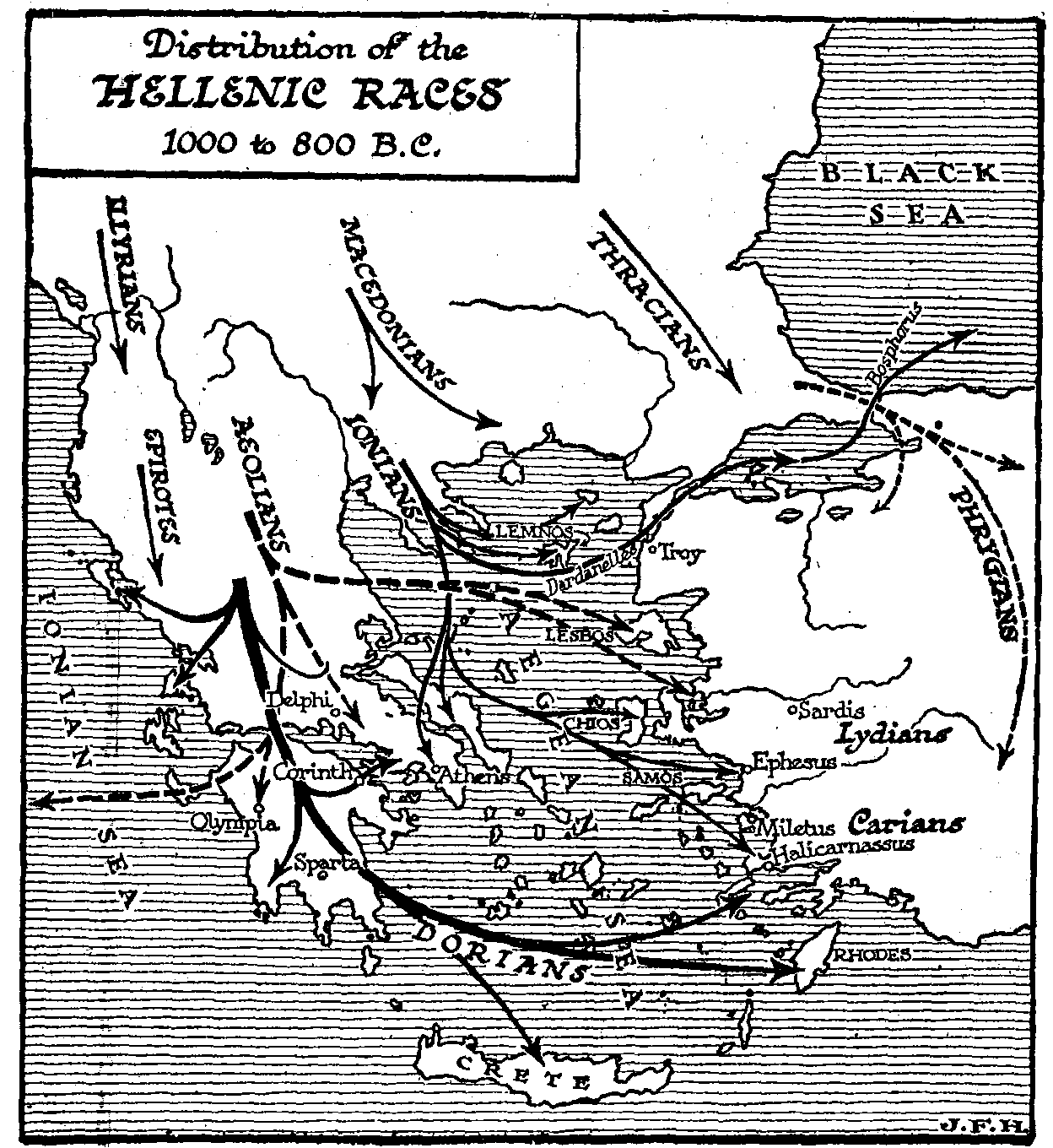
Map from H. G. Wells's The Outline of History (1920), showing the Dorian invasion as a migration from northern Greece

In 1893, Karl Julius Beloch attempted to integrate the Greek historical tradition with recent archaeological discoveries, such as those made at Mycenae by Heinrich Schliemann and Panagiotis Stamatakis. Beloch considered the Dorians to have been indigenous to Mycenaean Greece and to have differentiated from them during the eighth century BCE. However, his views were generally rejected in favour of invasion-based narratives. In response to Beloch, Eduard Meyer called the invasion "one of the few indubitably certain facts of earlier Greek history". (Note: Robertson 1980, p. 1, citing Meyer 1893, p. 73.) Christos Tsountas and Ernst Meyer, in 1893 and 1937 respectively, posited it as the reason for the destruction of the Mycenaean palaces at the end of the twelfth century BCE. At the end of the nineteenth century, Paul Kretschmer argued that an early form of the Greek language had spread from Anatolia, rather than from northern Europe, but that during this spread these proto-Greeks had divided into several tribes, of which the proto-Dorians were the last to migrate into Greece.

Some of the cultural changes, such as the widespread adoption of cremation, created similarities between Greek culture and that of the Urnfield culture of central Europe, lending support to the view that the Dorian invaders had come from the north. Alan Wace and Maurice S. Thompson advocated the northern-origin theory in their 1912 book Prehistoric Thessaly. In 1921, Stanley Casson attempted to trace the routes of the Dorian invasion based on the finds of Geometric pottery, and concluded that both Sparta and a settlement at the Dipylon Gate of Athens were Dorian. Nicholas Hammond did likewise in 1934, arguing that the Dorians had entered Greece via the Pindus mountains of Albania, contrary to the accounts in ancient Greek historians, by which they universally originated within Greece.

During the 1930s, 1940s and 1950s, the Dorian invasion paradigm remained dominant, partly as a result of the limited archaeological and historical evidence then available for the Greek world around and after the end of the Bronze Age. Carl Blegen, the excavator of the Mycenaean site of Pylos in Messenia from 1939, considered the site to have been destroyed by the Dorians, and adjusted his view of the date of Troy VIIa, which he believed to be the setting of the Trojan War, to make it compatible with this theory. He frequently discussed the Dorian invasion, among other then-current archaeological topics, in letters to Wace. The invasion became linked with other putative migrating peoples, known collectively as the Sea Peoples, mentioned in Egyptian and Near Eastern sources. Manolis Andronikos denied in 1954 that the Dorian invasion had happened; this view was considered "drastic" by John Myres, though Myres considered the archaeological and linguistic evidence for the invasion inconclusive, and that the mythical narratives surrounding it had been exaggerated by Greek settlers in Asia Minor. (Note: Myres 1954, pp. 279–282, citing Andronikos 1954.) In 1956, Wace suggested that the invasion was historical, but that it had involved only political rather than cultural change, since he viewed Greek culture as broadly continuous between the Late Bronze Age and the classical period. (Note: Dickinson 2020, p. 157, citing Wace's introduction to Ventris & Chadwick 1956. Dickinson cites the book in its second (1973) edition.)

From the 1960s onwards, linguistic arguments were advanced to support the Dorian invasion hypothesis. Certain common features of Arcadocypriot Greek, shared between Arcadia in the Peloponnese and the island of Cyprus, were held to be evidence that the two represented the remnants of a larger language group, broken up by the invading Dorians and including refugees who fled to Cyprus. The idea of the Dorian invasion remained the scholarly orthodoxy throughout the 1960s, and was adapted by Soviet historians, who integrated it into a Marxist view of history as the mechanism by which Greek culture transitioned from primitive communism to a mode of production based on slavery. In English-language scholarship, the focus of the debate became the effort to find material traces of the Dorians in Greek archaeological sites. Blegen stated in 1962 that "the fire-scarred ruins of all the great [Mycenaean] palaces" were "the telltale track of the Dorians".

During the 1960s, the Dorian invasion became connected with the nineteenth-century ideas of Jakob Philipp Fallmerayer, who had argued that modern Greeks were of Slavic ancestry rather than the descendants of classical Greeks; though Fallmerayer had dated this population replacement to the Byzantine period, his followers, such as Rhys Carpenter and Donald Nicol, saw the Dorian invasion as a similar point of discontinuity. (Note: Kotsonas 2016, p. 253, citing Carpenter 1966, pp. 12–14, 76–80 and Nicol 1986, p. 10.) The view of a break between Mycenaean and classical Greece was rejected in Greece itself: an updated 1970 edition of the History of the Greek Nation argued against it, as did a 1968 exhibition in Athens sponsored by the ruling military junta. One of the exhibition's panels characterised the Dorians as "the healthy powers of the [Greek] race". In 1980, Leonard Palmer defended the Dorian invasion hypothesis against recent criticisms, citing it as the only means of explaining the distribution of the West Greek dialects in the classical period. Robert Drews further defended it in 1988, writing that the Dorians conquered Greece by mastering new modes of warfare, to which the existing Mycenaean states failed to adapt. (Note: Drews 1988, esp. pp. 159–196; Dickinson 2006, p. 50 (with criticism of Drews's thesis).)

== In German nationalism ==
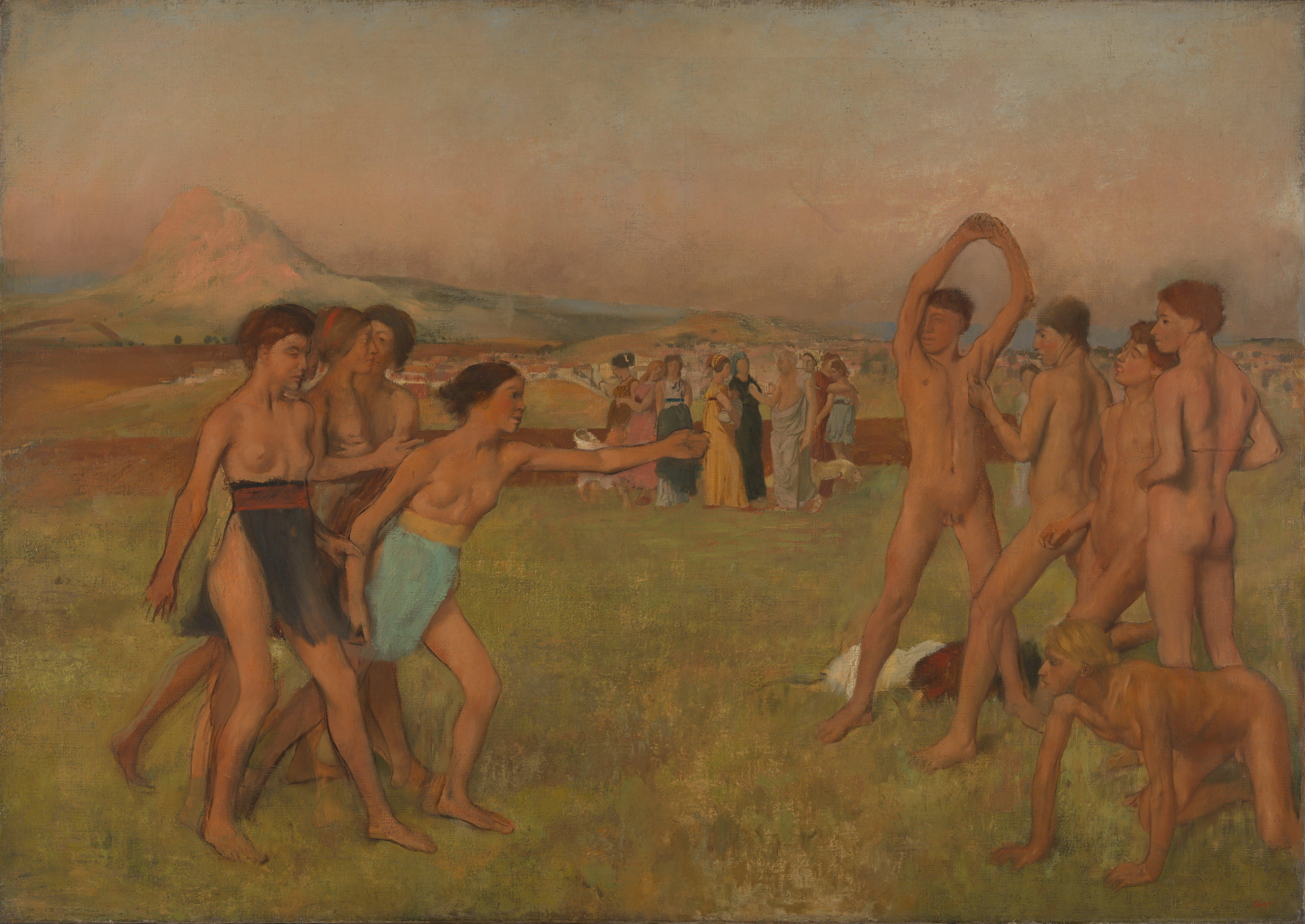
Young Spartans Exercising (c. 1860) by Edgar Degas: an idealised vision of Spartan pedagogical methods and social institutions

After the Enlightenment, eighteenth- and nineteenth-century Germans developed the Dorian invasion as part of the Sonderweg hypothesis, by which the German nation was imagined to have a preordained historical path and superior racial status. Building on developments in Indo-European studies, which reconstructed the linguistic connections between German, Greek and Sanskrit, the German language was considered to be particularly strongly associated with Greek, and German culture to be a continuation of that of ancient Greece. Germans were, under this paradigm, viewed as the "new Dorians". From 1794 onwards, Friedrich Schlegel promoted a Romantic and idealised view of Sparta as a definingly Dorian society. For Schlegel, Sparta represented a racial and cultural ideal, characterised by successful social integration and respect for the rights and dignity of women. This admiration and emulation of Sparta became a prominent feature of German nationalist ideologies.

Karl Otfried Müller extended his archaeological theories about the Dorians to promote a "Dorian way of life", based on his identification of the Dorians with the qualities of honour, liberty and patriotism. He argued that the god Apollo, whom he associated with the qualities of tranquillity, harmony and clarity, had been Dorian in origin. He contrasted this with Dionysus, whom he believed to embody the opposite qualities and to have entered Greek religion from Thrace. These ideas influenced the composer Richard Wagner, who used Müller's view of the Dorians as a stand-in for his own belief in the enmity between Germany and its neighbours, particularly in France and Italy. Müller saw Dorian culture as prefiguring the hierarchical, autocratic, militarised German state of Prussia: this became, in the words of Édouard Will, "a quasi-permanent temptation" in German intellectual culture. (Note: Schnapp-Gourbeillion 1986, p. 44, citing Will 1956, p. 11.) His ideas became associated with Prussian militarism; by the 1930s, Müller, militarism and ancient Sparta were closely connected in German political culture, to a much greater extent than they had been in Müller's own work.

=== Nazi racial theories ===
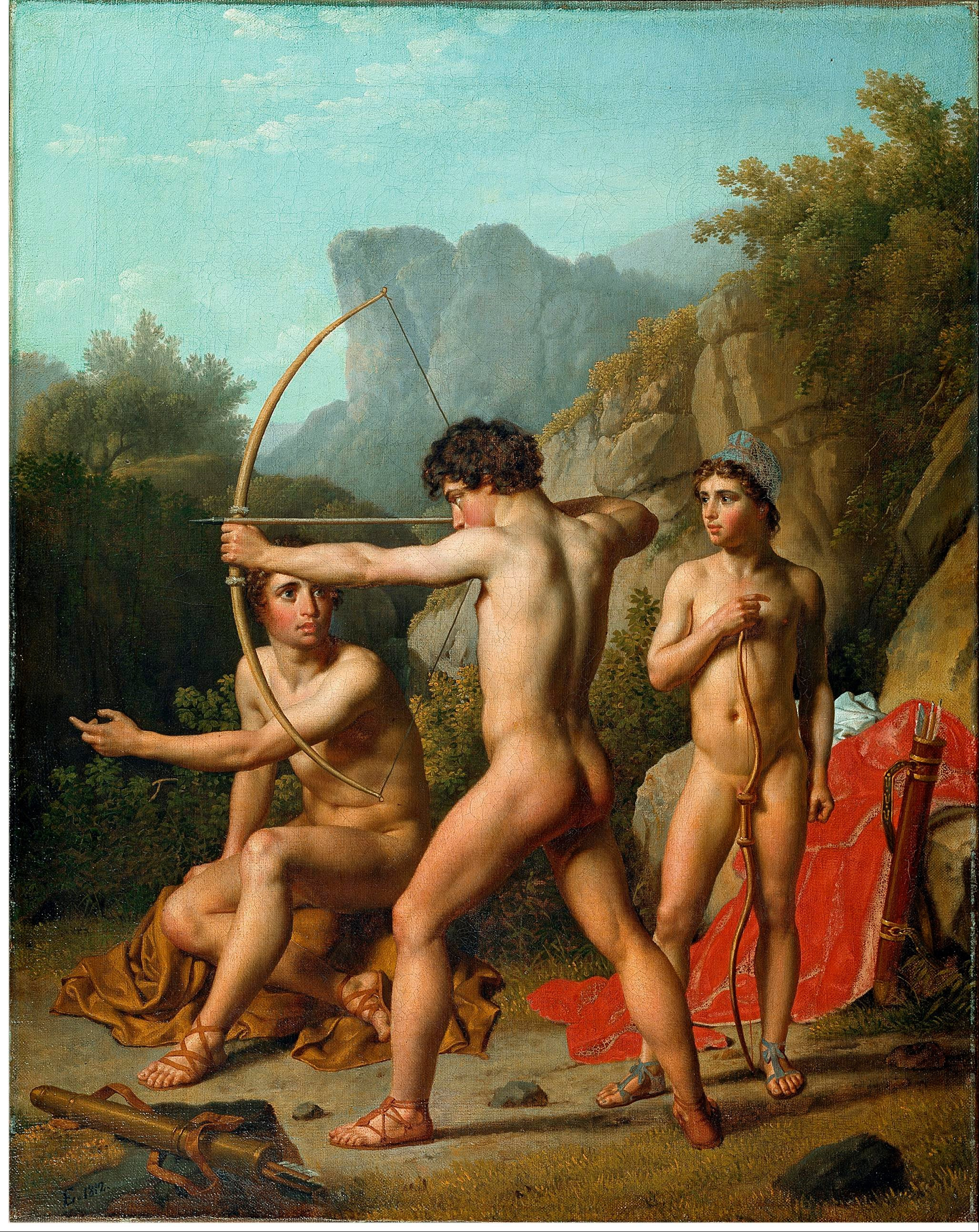
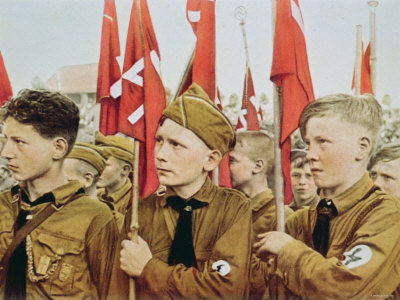
The military training of Spartan youths (left, as imagined by Christoffer Wilhelm Eckersberg in 1812) was seen in Nazi Germany as a precursor to that of the Hitler Youth (right, in 1933): both were imagined as the product of a common Dorian inheritance.

In 1929, Hans Günther – an early supporter of the Nazi Party and major influence upon its racial theories – published Racial History of the Hellenic and Roman Peoples (Rassengeschichte des Hellenischen und des Römischen Volkes), in which he argued that both the Greeks and Romans belonged to the Nordic race. Günther argued that references in ancient writers, such as Herodotus and Diodorus Siculus, to the mythical Hyperboreans as the ancestors of the Dorians represented a genuine memory that the Dorians had come from the far north. (Note: The Hyperboreans featured widely in Nazi racial theories, as the inhabitants of the mythical city-state of Ultima Thule, which was itself associated with Atlantis, and the supposed common ancestors of the Indo-European peoples.) He also adduced linguistic arguments, such as the fact that the Greek word iris means both "rainbow" and the iris of the eye, which he took as proof that the original speakers of Greek had had blue eyes rather than brown. In 1930, Alfred Rosenberg, a Nazi racial theorist and later war criminal, wrote of the Dorians as one of several waves of Aryan invaders into Greece, arguing that both Mycenaean and post-Mycenaean Greece, along with ancient Rome, were Nordic in racial character.

During the period of Nazi rule between 1933 and 1945, German classicists universally portrayed the Dorians, in the words of Richard Wolin, as "fearless Aryan conquerors", contrasted with supposedly racially inferior Ionians. In the framing of Annie Schnapp-Gourbeillion, the Nazis cast the Dorian invasion as "saving" Greece from the "contamination" of Asiatic races. Through the Dorian invasion, they argued that classical Greece was fundamentally Germanic in nature, and that Nazi Germany, which modelled its militarism and state-organised militarised training of boys on Sparta, represented the best of classical Greek virtues. The Dorians were also imagined as having invaded Italy: a 1940 work published in Leipzig argued for "indisputable connections" between protohistoric sites in northern Italy and those of Prussia and Scandinavia. The work of Fritz Schachermeyr, a prominent Nazi historian and adherent of race theory, was particularly influential in entrenching the Dorian invasion in German-speaking scholarship. (Note: Papadopoulos 2001, p. 287. On Schachermeyr, see Losemann 1999, pp. 232–233, Schmidt 2001, p. 298 and Wiedemann 2018, pp. 48–49.) In February 1941, Adolf Hitler stated his belief that the Aryan race had only reached its apogee through its supposed invasion of Greece and Italy.

The racialised view of the Dorians promoted in Nazi Germany was echoed by historians in other countries. Ioannis Koumaris, a German-trained anthropologist with a professorship at the University of Athens, concurred with Nazi views as to the primacy of race in historical events and social organisation, but argued that the Dorian migrations had been "local movements" within a heterogeneous Greek race. The fundamental aspects of the racialised view of the Dorian invasion were rarely denied, even by those opposed to Nazi rule and politics, such as the German exile Werner Jaeger and the French scholars Georges Dumézil and Charles Picard. Picard wrote in 1935 that the Dorian invasion had been "no bad thing ... [since] it allowed Greek art to cross the mirages of the Asian spirit". Where Müller's view of the Dorians as superior, civilising invaders was challenged, its critics, such as Gustave Glotz, rarely disputed the underlying paradigm of the invasion: instead, they portrayed the Dorians as barbaric, destructive forces. Schnapp-Gourbeillion writes of both Glotz and contemporary pro-Dorian scholars as having "recreate[d] from scratch a past marked by its false rationality and its moralising aspects". Although "Aryan" and related terms largely disappeared from scholarship following the downfall of Nazi Germany in 1945, the underlying paradigm of heroic, migrating invaders remained into the 1960s, both in mainstream historiography and in explicitly right-wing and Neo-Nazi works.

== Criticism and replacement in archaeological scholarship ==
=== Early challenges to the hypothesis ===
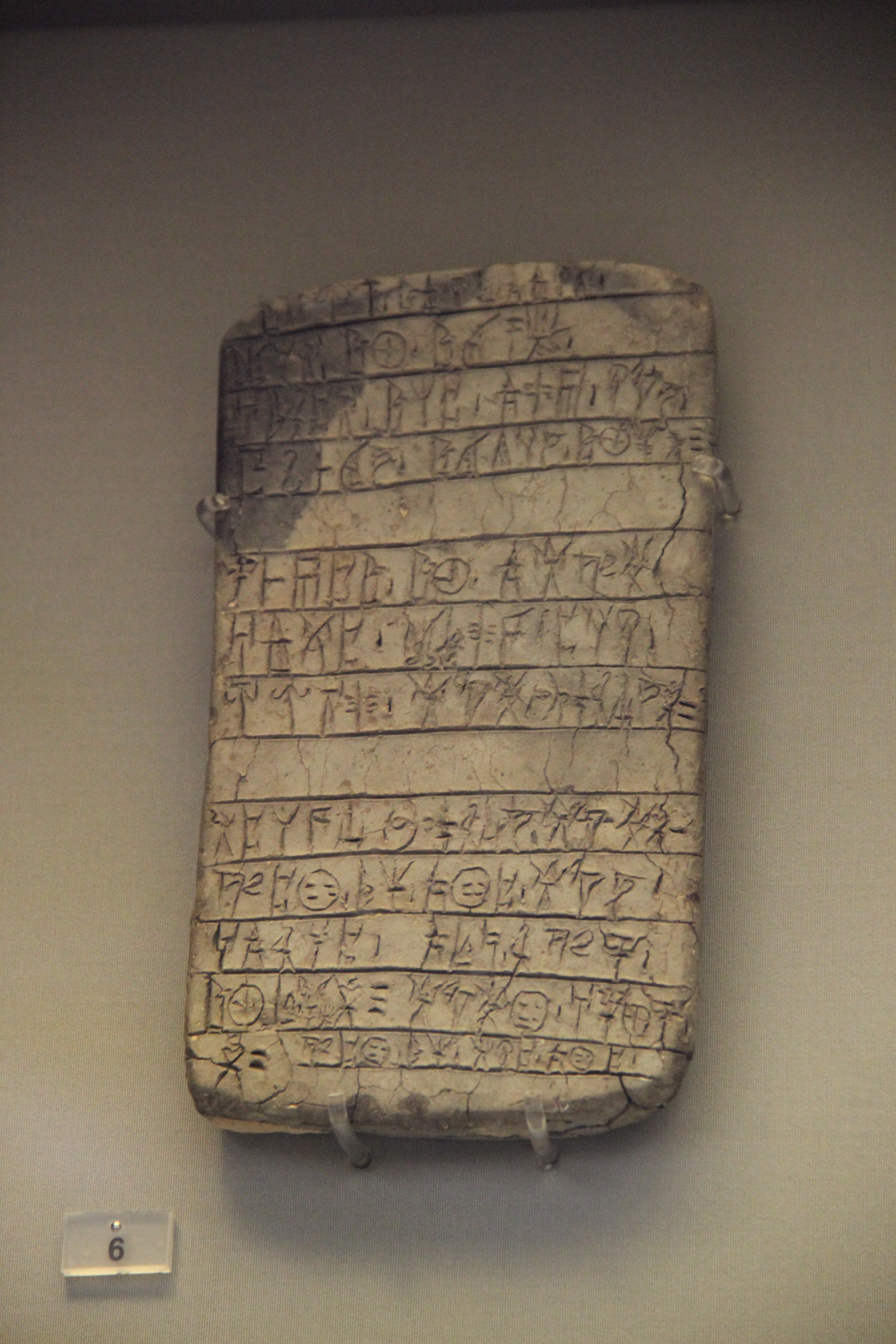
Linear B tablet from Pylos, c. 1180 BCE. The discovery that these tablets were written in Greek led to doubts over the Dorian invasion hypothesis.

The art historian Robert Cook has written that the association between the Dorians and Geometric pottery, despite its initial scholarly popularity, was never a comfortable fit with the evidence. In 1903, Hans Dragendorff challenged it, arguing that Geometric pottery was simply a development of Mycenaean styles: Dragendorff's view became the scholarly consensus after it was demonstrated by Bernhard Schweitzer in a 1917 work. (Note: Cook 2013, pp. 288, 290: Schweitzer's work is Schweitzer 1918.) In 1939, Gaetano De Sanctis, an Italian classicist who had refused to swear allegiance to the Fascist dictator Benito Mussolini, wrote a history of early Greece in which he rejected Müller's view of the Dorian invasion, and ascribed only a small historical role to the Dorians. (Note: Schnapp-Gourbeillion 1986, p. 48, referencing De Sanctis 1939. On De Sanctis and Mussolini, see Capristo 2005, p. 82.) The 1952 decipherment of Linear B indicated that Greek-speakers had lived in the Peloponnese since the Bronze Age; this led many scholars to abandon the Dorian invasion as a hypothesis.

From the 1960s onwards, new archaeological discoveries pushed into the Mycenaean period the chronological horizons of key cultural changes, such as the Naue II sword, the development of iron-working, the practice of cremation and the development of what became Geometric pottery. It also became clear that these were not universally found in supposedly "Doric" areas, and were often adopted piecemeal in a manner not easily explained by the migration of a conquering elite. (Note: Thomas 1993, pp. 70–70; Cook 2013, p. 6 (on pottery styles specifically).) Cook published an article in 1962 in which he called the Dorian invasion "not a subject that is worth much study", citing the paucity of available evidence: he considered that the invasion probably did take place, but that it left no trace in the material record and that most elements of the mythical and historical tradition concerning it were unproven. Vincent Desborough, in 1964, demonstrated the chronological inconsistency between the widespread adoption of burial in cist graves (c. 1100 BCE) and the destruction of the Mycenaean palaces (c. 1180 BCE). More broadly, archaeological studies in the 1960s moved away from migration as a dominant explanation for cultural change, leading in turn to the decline of the Dorian invasion and related hypotheses in mainstream scholarship. (Note: Wiedemann 2018, pp. 50–51 (applied specifically to the Dorian invasion); Hudson 1999, p. 148 (for archaeology in general).)

In the 1970s, various scholars, particularly in the United Kingdom, revived Beloch's argument that the Dorians had already been present in Greece during the Mycenaean period. John Chadwick argued that Special Mycenaean, a putative dialect of Mycenaean Greek posited by Ernst Risch in 1965, was an ancestral form of Doric Greek. (Note: The conclusions of both Risch and Chadwick as to Special Mycenaean are now generally rejected by scholars, and the evidence that it constituted a distinct dialect considered uncertain. Risch, for his own part, disagreed with Chadwick that Special Mycenaean was an ancestor of Doric.) The Dorian invasion was therefore recast as either a revolt by a previously subject population, or else only the last in a series of migrations. Desborough suggested that the Dorians had retreated from their initial invasion, thereby explaining the lack of evidence for their settlement after the destruction of the Mycenaean palaces, and returned in the Submycenaean period around 50–100 years later. (Note: Dickinson 2006, p. 44, citing Desborough 1972. For the dates of the Submycenaean period, see Whitley 2003, p. 83.) Anthony Snodgrass alternatively considered it most probable that the Dorian invasion had occurred, but that the Dorians had used identical material culture to the Mycenaeans whom they replaced, and that the received tradition as to the location of Dorian settlement was unreliable. (Note: Dickinson 2006, p. 44, citing Snodgrass 1971, pp. 311–312.)

In 1978, Klaus Kilian proposed the name "Dorian Ware" for a class of non-wheel-made pottery, now known as Handmade Burnished Ware, found in post-destruction layers of his excavation at Tiryns. He suggested that this pottery should be associated with Dorian invaders, to whom he attributed the site's destruction. However, the same pottery was later found in layers predating the site's destruction, and it is now considered to have been of local Mycenaean manufacture, (Note: Pilides 1991, p. 18, citing Kilian 1978, p. 119 (for the "Dorian Ware" label) and Kilian, Podzuweit & Weisshaar 1981, pp. 170, 180–181 (for the discovery in pre-destruction layers). For the techniques and location of manufacture of Handmade Burnished Ware, see also Boileau et al. 2010, p. 1678.) or else the work of small immigrant populations, who may already have been present in Mycenaean society. Paul Cartledge, in 1979, defended the historicity of the Dorian settlement of Sparta but noted that such a settlement could not have occurred prior to c. 950 BCE, and so was incompatible with the Greek myths of the Dorian invasion and of the Heracleidae. However, he also noted that no material-culture innovations were any longer attributed to the Dorians, writing that "the Dorians, archaeologically speaking, do not exist".

By the early 1980s, the reality of the Dorian invasion was widely doubted in scholarship. In 1978, Carol G. Thomas wrote that Chadwick's linguistic argument was incompatible with the mythological tradition, and would imply that the Dorian invasion was a post facto ethnogenesis myth created in the Iron Age. Noel Robertson wrote in 1980 that the veracity of the invasion was widely doubted, and that the only remaining evidence for it was the Greek mythical tradition, which he considered to be better explained as a later innovation. In 1982, Annie Schnapp-Gourbeillion called the Dorian invasion "a spectre [haunting] historians of ancient Greece", and wrote that the archaeological evidence then available could support, at best, the hypothesis of "a series of violent but limited raids" rather than a theory of invasion followed by large-scale settlement. By the 1990s, the Dorian invasion was considered a myth by most scholars in the field, though it continued to have adherents, such as Birgitta Eder, Nicholas Hammond and Theodore Cressy Skeat, and remained prevalent in German-speaking scholarship. (Note: In a 2013 article, Eder wrote that the Dorian invasion had been "seriously called into question" by archaeological discoveries, but suggested that some form of population movement may explain the linguistic and demographic changes considered to have occurred between the Bronze Age and the Early Iron Age.)

=== Current views of the Late Bronze Age collapse ===
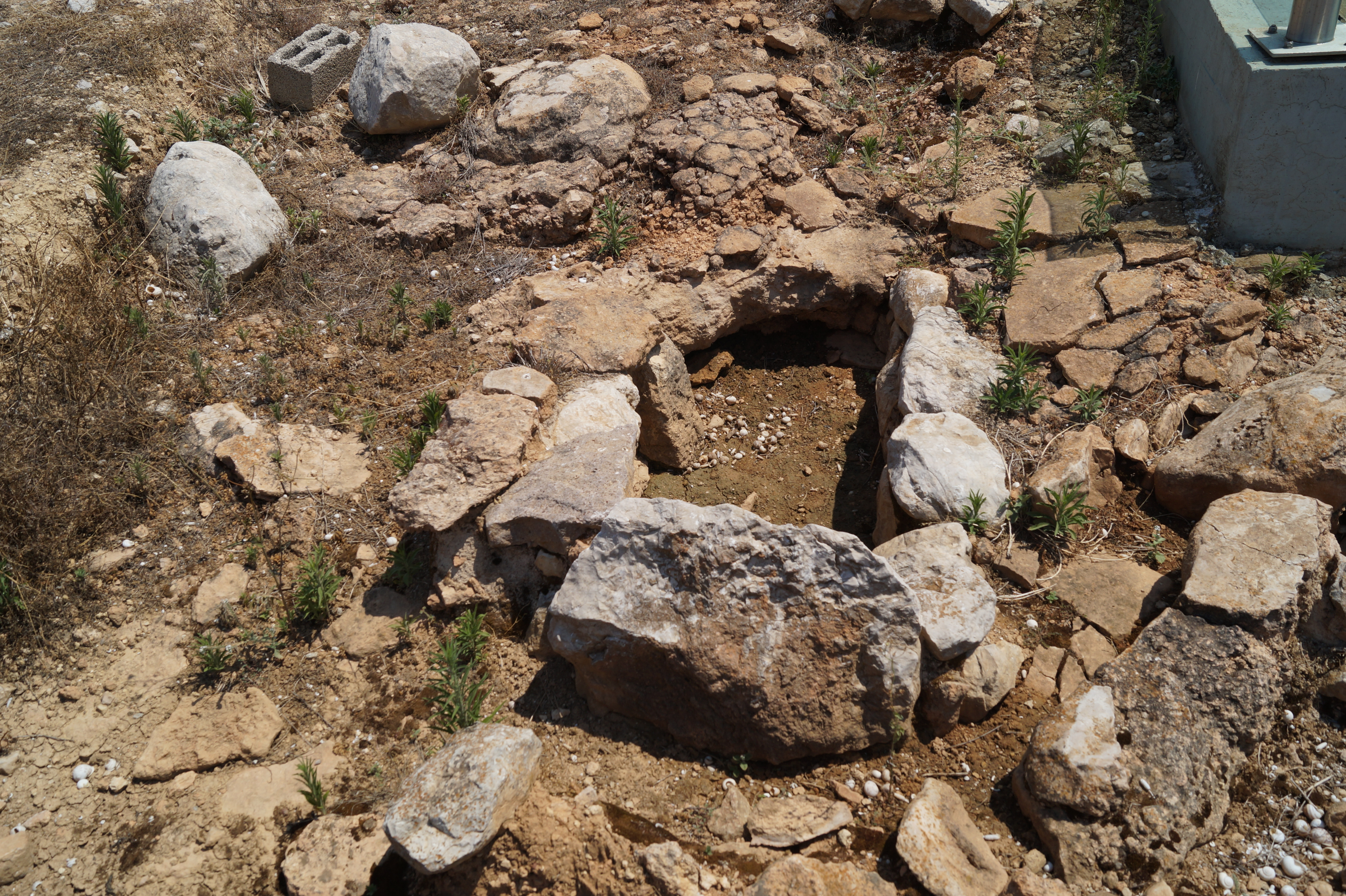
Cist grave in the Mycenaean cemetery at Dendra in the Argolid. Previously associated with the Dorian invasion, such graves are known to have been used throughout the Mycenaean period.

The theory that the Dorians invaded the Peloponnese or otherwise migrated there is now rejected as a "scholarly mirage". (Note: Papadopoulos 2014, p. 185: "The Dorian invasion/migration has dissolved into a scholarly mirage"; Cline 2024, pp. 1, 3: "it probably never happened" and "the idea of a Dorian invasion has been tabled, shelved, and discounted by scholars for several decades now"; Middleton 2017, p. 137: "the old and discredited idea of a Dorian invasion".) It is generally agreed that the collapse of Mycenaean palatial civilisation is better explained by endogenous factors, such as social conflicts or the breakdown of the palaces' socio-economic model, possibly exacerbated by external causes such as natural disaster, disease, climate change and changing technologies. (Note: Middleton 2017, pp. 145–148, who notes that these external causes generally suffer from a paucity of evidence, or else fit poorly with the archaeological evidence as explanations of collapse; Broodbank 2013, pp. 459–468.) It is also considered doubtful whether the events of the end of the Bronze Age should be explained as a single, interconnected collapse, and that the "collapse" was largely limited to the regions, institutions and practices associated with palatial administration. Most regions of Greece were outside the control of palatial states in the Mycenaean period and saw continuity in their populations, culture and traditions. (Note: Middleton 2020, p. 9; see also, for the same point in a broader Mediterranean context, Broodbank 2013, pp. 470–471.)

While population movements probably occurred at the end of the Bronze Age, neither the mythical tradition nor the archaeological evidence are compatible with a single large-scale migration of a coherent population of "Dorians" into the Peloponnese. Where movements of people are believed to have occurred, they seem to have resulted in net migration away from Mycenaean centres; the population of the areas previously considered to have been settled by Dorians appears to have declined sharply. Furthermore, these population movements, on a smaller scale than imagined by the Dorian invasion, are now recognised as part of a broader, multi-causal systems collapse, rather than as a monocausal explanation for the changes of the period.

Although cultural and linguistic change did occur between the Late Bronze Age and the Early Iron Age, different aspects of the changes happened at different times and speeds and affected different regions, rather than occurring suddenly and simultaneously, as would be expected with a single large-scale movement of people. Cultural features previously believed to have been introduced by the Dorian invasion, such as iron-working, Protogeometric and Geometric pottery, cist graves and cremation, are now known either to have predated the palatial destructions or to have originated in areas of Greece, such as Attica and Euboea, which were not considered to have been affected by the invasion. More generally, modern scholarship has problematised the relationship between cultural forms and ethnic identity, corresponding to the decline of the culture-historical paradigm by which changes in material culture were generally explained by population transfer.

Modern scholarship explains the ancient narrative of the Dorian invasion as a rationalising myth, created as part of a process of ethnogenesis by Peloponnesian communities whose cultural forms gradually converged over time. Oliver Dickinson has written that the myths of the Dorian invasion are "likely to have little relevance to what actually happened", citing the long span of time between the supposed events and the composition of the retellings that survive, as well as the distorting effect of contemporary politics, ideology and society upon any historical elements that may have existed in the narratives. (Note: Dickinson 2020, p. 155, echoing Osborne 2009, pp. 50–51.)

== Bibliography ==
=== Ancient sources ===
- Herodotus. Histories – via Perseus Digital Library.
- Pausanias. Description of Greece – via Perseus Digital Library.
- Thucydides. History of the Peloponnesian War – via Perseus Digital Library.

=== Modern sources ===
- Allan, William (2001). Introduction. The Children of Heracles. By Euripides. Allan, William (ed.). Oxford: Aris & Phillips. pp. 21–58. ISBN 978-0-85668-741-9.
- Andronikos, Manolis (1954). Η "δωρική εισβολή" και τα αρχαιολογικά ευρήματα [The "Dorian Invasion" and Archaeological Discoveries] (PDF). Ελληνικά (in Greek). 13: 251–240. ISSN 2974-8267.
- Baumbach, Lydia (1977). The Impact of the Decipherment of the Linear B Script on Linguistic and Historical Studies. University of Cape Town. ISBN 0-7992-0204-5.
- Baumbach, Lydia (1980). "A Doric Fifth Column?". Acta Classica. 23 (1): 1–12. hdl:10520/AJA00651141_978. ISSN 0065-1141.
- Bayliss, Andrew J. (2020). The Spartans. Oxford University Press. ISBN 978-0-19-885308-4.
- Bernal, Martin (1987). Black Athena: The Afroasiatic Roots of Classical Civilization. Vol. 1. New Brunswick: Rutgers University Press. ISBN 0-8135-1276-X.
- Blegen, Carl W. (1962). The Mycenaean Age, the Trojan War, the Dorian Invasion, and Other Problems. Lectures in Memory of Louisa Taft Semple. University of Cincinnati. OCLC 236877.
- Boileau, Marie-Claude; Badre, Leila; Capet, Emmanuelle; Jung, Reinhard; Mommsen, Hans (2010). "Foreign Ceramic Tradition, Local Clays: The Handmade Burnished Ware of Tell Kazel (Syria)". Journal of Archaeological Science. 37 (7): 1678–1689. Bibcode:2010JArSc..37.1678B. doi:10.1016/j.jas.2010.01.028. ISSN 0305-4403.
- Broodbank, Cyprian (2013). The Making of the Middle Sea. London: Thames and Hudson. ISBN 978-0-19-999978-1.
- Capristo, Annalisa (2005). "The Exclusion of Jews from Italian Academies". In Zimmerman, Joshua D. (ed.). Jews in Italy Under Fascist and Nazi Rule, 1922–1945. Cambridge University Press. pp. 81–95. ISBN 978-0-521-84101-6.
- Carpenter, Rhys (1966). Discontinuity in Greek Civilization. Cambridge University Press. OCLC 684021.
- Cartledge, Paul (1979). Sparta and Lakonia: A Regional History. London: Routledge. ISBN 0-415-26276-3.
- Casson, Stanley (1921). "The Dorian Invasion Reviewed in the Light of Some New Evidence". Man. 21: 70–71. doi:10.2307/2840241. JSTOR 2840241.
- Chadwick, John (1976). "Who Were the Dorians?". La Parola del Passato. 31: 103–117. ISSN 0031-2355.
- Chapoutot, Johann (2016) [2008]. Greeks, Romans, Germans: How the Nazis Usurped Europe's Classical Past. Translated by Nybakken, Richard R. Berkeley: University of California Press. doi:10.1525/california/9780520275720.001.0001. ISBN 978-0-520-29297-0.
- Christodoulou, Despina (2007). "Ancient Sparta in the Historiography of 19th-Century Greece: A Disappointing Hegemon for the Hellenic Nation". In Birgalias, Nikos; Buraselis, Kostas; Cartledge, Paul (eds.). The Contribution of Ancient Sparta to Political Thought and Practice. Athens: Alexandria Publications. pp. 433–448. ISBN 978-960-221-378-0.
- Cline, Eric H. (2024). After 1177 BC: The Survival of Civilisations. Princeton and Oxford: Princeton University Press. ISBN 978-0-691-19213-0. LCCN 2023022187.
- Cook, Robert M. (1962). "The Dorian invasion". Proceedings of the Cambridge Philological Society. 8 (188): 16–22. doi:10.1017/S0068673500005319. JSTOR 44712965.
- Cook, Robert M. (2013) [1960]. Greek Painted Pottery (3rd ed.). London and New York: Routledge. ISBN 978-0-415-13860-4.
- Coulson, William D. E. (1990). The Greek Dark Ages: A Review of the Evidence and Suggestions for Future Research. Athens: S. Vouyouka. OCLC 30560557.
- Daniel, John Franklin (1948). "The Dorian Invasion: The Setting". American Journal of Archaeology. 52 (1): 107–110. doi:10.2307/500556. ISSN 0002-9114. JSTOR 500556.
- De Sanctis, Gaetano (1939). Storia dei Greci dalle origini alla fine del secolo V [History of the Greeks from the Beginning to the End of the 5th Century] (in Italian). Florence: La Nuova Italia. OCLC 1128701517.
- Desborough, Vincent (1972). The Greek Dark Ages. London: Benn. ISBN 0-510-03261-3.
- Dickinson, Oliver (2020). "The Irrelevance of Greek 'Tradition'". In Middleton, Guy D. (ed.). Collapse and Transformation: The Late Bronze Age to Early Iron Age in the Aegean. Oxford: Oxbow Books. pp. 153–160. ISBN 978-1-78925-428-0.
- Dickinson, Oliver (2006). The Aegean from Bronze to Iron Age: Continuity and Change. New York: Taylor and Francis. ISBN 978-1-134-77871-3.
- Drews, Robert (1988). The Coming of the Greeks: Indo-European Conquests in the Aegean and the Near East. Princeton University Press. ISBN 0-691-18658-8.
- Drews, Robert (1993). The End of the Bronze Age: Changes in Warfare and the Catastrophe ca. 1200 B.C. Princeton University Press. ISBN 0-691-02591-6.
- Eder, Birgitta (2013). "Dorians". Encyclopedia of Ancient History. Hoboken: Blackwell. p. 2213. doi:10.1002/9781444338386.wbeah02058. ISBN 978-1-4051-7935-5.
- Fappas, Yannis (2015). "The 'Govs' of Mycenaean Archaeology: The Friendship of Carl W. Blegen and Alan J. B. Wace as Seen Through Their Correspondence". In Vogeikoff-Brogan, Natalia; Davis, Jack; Florou, Vasiliki (eds.). Carl Blegen: Personal and Archaeological Narratives. Atlanta: Lockwood Press. pp. 63–84. ISBN 978-1-937040-23-9.
- Foster, Daniel H. (2010). Wagner's Ring Cycle and the Greeks. Cambridge University Press. ISBN 978-1-139-48631-6.
- Gallou, Chrysanthi (2019). Death in Mycenaean Lakonia (17th to 11th C. BC): A Silent Place. Oxford: Oxbow Books. ISBN 978-1-78925-245-3.
- Goldhill, Simon (2017). "The Limits of the Case Study: Exemplarity and the Reception of Classical Literature" (PDF). New Literary History. 48 (3): 415–435. doi:10.1353/nlh.2017.0023. ISSN 1080-661X.
- Hall, Jonathan M. (1997). Ethnic Identity in Greek Antiquity. Cambridge University Press. doi:10.1017/cbo9780511605642. ISBN 978-0-521-78999-8.
- Hall, Jonathan M. (2002). Hellenicity: Between Ethnicity and Culture. University of Chicago Press. ISBN 0-226-31330-1.
- Hall, Jonathan M. (2006). "Dorians". In Wilson, Nigel (ed.). Encyclopedia of Ancient Greece. New York: Taylor and Francis. doi:10.4324/9780203958766. ISBN 978-0-203-95876-6.
- Hall, Jonathan M. (2014). A History of the Archaic Greek World, ca 1000–479 BC (2nd ed.). Chichester: Wiley-Blackwell. ISBN 978-1-118-30127-2.
- Hallmannsecker, Martin (2022). Roman Ionia: Constructions of Cultural Identity in Western Asia Minor. Cambridge University Press. ISBN 978-1-009-15018-7.
- Hammond, N. G. L. (1934). "Prehistoric Epirus and the Dorian Invasion". Annual of the British School at Athens. 32: 131–179. doi:10.1017/S0068245400004007. ISSN 0068-2454.
- Hooker, James Thomas (1985). "Die griechische Rückerinnerung im Lichte neuer Forschungen by Fritz Schachermeyr (Review)". Gnomon. 57 (1): 26–29. ISSN 0017-1417. JSTOR 27688885.
- Horrocks, Geoffrey (2010). Greek: A History of the Language and Its Speakers. Chichester: Wiley. ISBN 978-1-118-78515-7.
- Howatson, Margaret C., ed. (2013). "Heracleidae". The Oxford Companion to Classical Literature (3rd ed.). Oxford University Press. pp. 283–284. ISBN 978-0-19-954855-2.
- Hudson, Mark (1999). Ruins of Identity: Ethnogenesis in the Japanese Islands. Honolulu: University of Hawaii Press. ISBN 0-8248-6419-0.
- Immerwahr, Sara Anderson (1971). The Neolithic and Bronze Ages. The Athenian Agora. Vol. 13. Princeton: American School of Classical Studies at Athens. OCLC 412233.
- Immerwahr, Raymond (1980). "Classicist Values in the Critical Thought of Friedrich Schlegel". The Journal of English and Germanic Philology. 79 (3): 376–389. ISSN 0363-6941. JSTOR 27708684.
- Kennell, Nigel M. (2010). Spartans: A New History. Chichester: Wiley. ISBN 978-1-4443-6053-0.
- Kilian, Klaus; Podzuweit, Christian; Weisshaar, Hans-Joachim (1981). "Ausgrabungen in Tiryns 1978, 1979" [Excavations in Tiryns, 1978 and 1979]. Archäologischer Anzeiger (in German): 149–256. ISSN 0003-8105.
- Kilian, Klaus (1978). "Nordwestgriechische Keramik Aus Der Argolis Und Ihre Entsprechungen in der Subapenninfacies" [North-West-Greek Pottery from Argolis and Its Correspondences in the Sub-Apennine Facies]. Atti della XX Riunione Scientifica dell' Instituto Italiano di Preistoria e Protohistoria in Basilicata (in German). Florence: Italian Institute for Prehistory and Protohistory. pp. 311–320. ISBN 88-6045-027-6.
- Knapp, A. Bernard; Manning, Stuart (2016). "Crisis in Context: The End of the Late Bronze Age in the Eastern Mediterranean". American Journal of Archaeology. 120 (1): 99–149. doi:10.3764/aja.120.1.0099. ISSN 0002-9114. JSTOR 10.3764/aja.120.1.0099.
- Kokkinos, George; Karasarinis, Markos (2016). "Tracing Eugenics: German Influences on a Greek Background, c. 1930–45". In Clara, Fernando; Ninhos, Cláudia (eds.). Nazi Germany and Southern Europe 1933–1945: Science, Culture and Politics. Houndmills: Palgrave Macmillan. pp. 153–168. doi:10.1057/9781137551528. ISBN 978-1-349-56746-1.
- Konaris, Michael (2011). "Dionysos in Nineteenth-Century Scholarship". In Schlesier, Renate (ed.). A Different God? Dionysos and Ancient Polytheism. Berlin: De Gruyter. pp. 467–478. doi:10.1515/9783110222357.467. ISBN 978-3-11-022235-7.
- Kotsonas, Antonis (2016). "Politics of Periodization and the Archaeology of Early Greece". American Journal of Archaeology. 120 (2): 239–270. doi:10.3764/aja.120.2.0239. ISSN 0002-9114.
- Kurlander, Eric (2017). Hitler's Monsters: A Supernatural History of the Third Reich. New Haven: Yale University Press. doi:10.12987/yale/9780300189452.003 (inactive 12 July 2025). ISBN 978-0-300-19037-3.
- Kustrin, Orestis; Mangan, J. A. (2003). "Lasting Legacy? Spartan Life as a Germanic Educational Ideal: Karl Ortfried Müller". In Mangan, J. A. (ed.). Militarism, Sport, Europe: War Without Weapons. The European Sports History Review. Vol. 5. London: Frank Cass. pp. 29–46. ISBN 0-203-58190-3.
- Lemos, Irene S. (2002). The Protogeometric Aegean: The Archaeology of the Late Eleventh and Tenth Centuries BC. Oxford University Press. ISBN 0-19-925344-7.
- Lis, Bartłomiej (2009). "Handmade and Burnished Pottery in the Eastern Mediterranean at the End of the Bronze Age: Towards an Explanation for Its Diversity and Geographical Distribution". In Bachhuber, Christoph; Roberts, R. Gareth (eds.). Forces of Transformation: The End of the Bronze Age in the Mediterranean (PDF). Vol. 1. Oxford: Oxbow Books. pp. 152–163. ISBN 978-1-84217-503-3. JSTOR j.ctt1cd0ppd.22.
- Losemann, Volker (1999). "The Nazi Concept of Rome". In Edwards, Catherine (ed.). Roman Presences: Receptions of Rome in European Culture, 1789–1945. Cambridge University Press. pp. 221–235. ISBN 0-521-59197-X.
- Luraghi, Nino (2008). The Ancient Messenians: Constructions of Ethnicity and Memory. Cambridge University Press. doi:10.1017/CBO9780511481413. ISBN 978-0-511-48141-3.
- Malkin, Irad (1994). Myth and Territory in the Spartan Mediterranean. Cambridge University Press. ISBN 0-521-41183-1.
- Méndez Dosuna, Julián (2007). "The Doric Dialects". In Christidis, Anastassios-Fivos (ed.). A History of Ancient Greek: From the Beginnings to Late Antiquity. Cambridge University Press. pp. 444–459. ISBN 978-0-521-83307-3.
- Meyer, Eduard (1893). Geschichte des Altertums [History of Antiquity] (in German). Vol. 2. J. G. Cotta'sche Buchhandlung. OCLC 1149368309.
- Middleton, Guy D. (2017). Understanding Collapse: Ancient History and Modern Myths. Cambridge University Press. ISBN 978-1-107-15149-9.
- Middleton, Guy D. (2020). "Mycenaean Collapse(s) c. 1200 BC". In Middleton, Guy D. (ed.). Collapse and Transformation: The Late Bronze Age to Early Iron Age in the Aegean. Oxford: Oxbow Books. pp. 9–22. ISBN 978-1-78925-428-0.
- Middleton, Guy D. (2024). "Getting Closer to the Late Bronze Age Collapse in the Aegean and Eastern Mediterranean, c. 1200 BC". Antiquity. 98 (397): 260–263. doi:10.15184/aqy.2023.187. ISSN 0003-598X.
- Morgan, Kathryn A. (2015). Pindar and the Construction of Syracusan Monarchy in the Fifth Century B.C. Oxford University Press. ISBN 978-0-19-026661-5.
- Musti, Domenico (1985). "Introduzione" [Introduction]. In Musti, Domenico (ed.). Le origini dei Greci: Dori e mundo egeo [The Origins of the Greeks: Dorians and the Aegean World] (in Italian). Editori Laterza. pp. vii–xxv. ISBN 88-420-2500-3.
- Myres, John L. (1954). Gray, Dorothea (ed.). Homer and His Critics. Vol. 2. London: Routledge. OCLC 337466.
- Nagy, Gregory (8 November 2019). "Thinking comparatively about Greek mythology XVI, with a focus on Dorians led by kingly 'sons' of Hēraklēs the kingmaker". Classical Inquiries. Center for Hellenic Studies, Harvard University.
- Nicol, Donald (1986) [1971]. "Byzantium and Greece". In Jeffreys, Elizabeth; Haldon, John; Cormack, Robin (eds.). Studies in Late Byzantine History and Prosopography. London: Variorum Reprints. pp. 2–20. ISBN 0-86078-190-9.
- Nilsson, Martin P. (1953). "Poseidon und die Entstehung des griechischen Götterglaubens (Review)". The American Journal of Philology. 74 (2): 161–168. doi:10.2307/292495. ISSN 0002-9475. JSTOR 292495.
- Osborne, Robin (2009). Greece in the Making (2nd ed.). New York: Routledge. ISBN 978-0-415-46991-3.
- Palaima, Thomas G. (1998). "Special vs Normal Mycenaean: Hand 24 and Writing in the Service of the King?". In Bennet, John; Driessen, Jan (eds.). A-NA-QO-TA: Studies Presented to J. T. Killen. Minos. Vol. 33–34. Salamanca: Ediciones universidad de Salamanca. pp. 205–221. ISBN 0-387-25497-8. ISSN 0544-3733.
- Palmer, Leonard R. (1980). The Greek Language. London: Faber and Faber. ISBN 1-85399-466-9 – via Internet Archive.
- Papadopoulos, John K. (2001). "Birgitta Eder: Argolis, Lakonien, Messenien: vom Ende der Mykenischen Palastzeit bis zur Einwanderung der Dorier (Review)". European Journal of Archaeology. 4 (2): 287–288. doi:10.1179/eja.2001.4.2.287. ISSN 1461-9571.
- Papadopoulos, John K. (2014). "Greece in the Early Iron Age: Mobility, Commodities, Polities, and Literacy". In Knapp, A. Bernard; van Dommelen, Peter (eds.). The Cambridge Prehistory of the Bronze and Iron Age Mediterranean. Cambridge University Press. pp. 178–195. doi:10.1017/CHO9781139028387.014. ISBN 978-0-521-76688-3.
- Pilides, Despina (1991). Handmade Burnished Wares of the Late Bronze Age in Cyprus (PDF) (Ph.D.). Vol. 1. University of London.
- Priestley, Jessica (2014). Herodotus and Hellenistic Culture: Literary Studies in the Reception of the Histories. Oxford University Press. ISBN 978-0-19-965309-6. LCCN 2013945562.
- Pringle, Heather (2006). The Master Plan: Himmler's Scholars and the Holocaust. New York: Hyperion Books. ISBN 978-0-7868-6886-5.
- Robertson, Noel (1980). "The Dorian Invasion and Corinthian Ritual". Classical Philology. 75 (1): 1–22. doi:10.1086/366529. JSTOR 267822.
- Roche, Helen (2013). Sparta's German Children: The Ideal of Ancient Sparta in the Royal Prussian Cadet-Corps, 1818–1920, and in National-Socialist Elite Schools (the Napolas), 1933–1945. Swansea: Classical Press of Wales. doi:10.2307/j.ctvvnbqm. ISBN 978-1-905125-55-5.
- Romanos, Chloé Léa (2011). Handmade Burnished Ware in Late Bronze Age Greece and Its Makers (PDF) (Ph.D). Vol. 1. University of Birmingham.
- Salus, Carol (1985). "Degas' Young Spartans Exercising". Art Bulletin. 67 (3): 501–506. doi:10.2307/3050964. ISSN 0004-3079. JSTOR 3050964.
- Schmidt, Peter Lebrecht (2001). "Latin Studies in Germany, 1933–1945: Institutional Conditions, Political Pressures, Scholarly Consequences". In Harrison, Stephen J. (ed.). Texts, Ideas, and the Classics: Scholarship, Theory, and Classical Literature. Oxford University Press. pp. 285–300. ISBN 0-19-924746-3.
- Schnapp-Gourbeillion, Annie (1986) [1982]. "L'invasion dorienne a-t-elle eu lieu?" [The Dorian Invasion: Did It Take Place?]. In Mossé, Claude (ed.). La Grèce ancienne [Ancient Greece] (in French). Paris: Éditions du Seuil. pp. 43–57. ISBN 2-7578-1027-8.
- Schofield, Louise (2007). The Mycenaeans. New York: J. Paul Getty Museum. ISBN 978-0-89236-867-9.
- Schweitzer, Bernhard (1918). Untersuchungen zur Chronologie [und Geschichite] der geometrischen Stile in Griechenland [Investigations into the Chronology [and History] of Geometric Styles in Greece] (in German). Karlsruhe: G. Braun. OCLC 459180473.
- Snodgrass, Anthony (1971). The Dark Age of Greece. Edinburgh University Press. ISBN 0-85224-089-9.
- Snodgrass, Anthony (2003). "Nicholas Geoffrey Lemprière Hammond 1907–2001" (PDF). Proceedings of the British Academy. 120: 243–259. ISSN 0068-1202.
- Staudenmaier, Peter (2014). Between Occultism and Nazism: Anthroposophy and the Politics of Race in the Fascist Era. Leiden: Brill. ISBN 978-90-04-27015-2.
- Szemerényi, Oscar (1982). "The Origin of the Name of the Dorians" (PDF). Glossologia. 1: 73–82. ISSN 2945-2627.
- Thomas, Carol G.; Conant, Craig (1999). Citadel to City-State: The Transformation of Greece, 1200–700 BCE. Bloomington: Indiana University Press. ISBN 0-253-33496-9.
- Thomas, Carol G. (1978). "Found: The Dorians: Archaeology and Greek Linguistics at the End of the Late Bronze Age" (PDF). Expedition. Vol. 20, no. 3. Penn Museum. pp. 21–25. ISSN 0014-4738.
- Thomas, Carol G. (1993). Myth Becomes History: Pre-Classical Greece (PDF). Publications of the Association of Ancient Historians. Vol. 4. Claremont: Regina Books. ISBN 0-941690-52-0.
- Thompson, Rupert (2003). "Special vs Normal Mycenaean Revisited" (PDF). Minos. 37–38: 337–369. ISSN 2530-9110.
- van Beek, Lucien (2022). "Greek". In Olander, Thomas (ed.). The Indo-European Language Family: A Phylogenetic Perspective. Cambridge University Press. pp. 173–201. doi:10.1017/9781108758666.011. ISBN 978-1-108-75866-6.
- Ventris, Michael; Chadwick, John (1956). Documents in Mycenaean Greek. Cambridge University Press. OCLC 214942102.
- Voutsaki, Sofia (2000). "Review: The Dorian Invasion". Classical Review. 50 (1): 232–233. doi:10.1093/cr/50.1.232. ISSN 0009-840X. JSTOR 3065393.
- Whitley, James (2001). The Archaeology of Ancient Greece. Cambridge University Press. ISBN 978-0-521-62733-7.
- Whitley, James (2003). Style and Society in Dark Age Greece: The Changing Face of a Pre-Literate Society 1100–700 BC. Cambridge University Press. ISBN 0-521-54585-4.
- Wiedemann, Felix (2018). "The Aryans: Ideology and Historiographical Narrative Types in the Nineteenth and Early Twentieth Centuries". In Roche, Helen; Demetriou, Kyriakos N. (eds.). Brill's Companion to the Classics, Fascist Italy and Nazi Germany. Leiden: Brill. pp. 31–59. ISBN 978-90-04-29906-1.
- Will, Édouard (1956). Doriens et Ioniens: essai sur la valeur du critère ethnique appliqué à l'étude de l'histoire et de la civilisation grecques [Dorians and Ionians: Essay on the Value of the Ethnic Criteria Applied to the Study of Greek History and Civilisation]. Publications de la faculté des lettres de l'Université de Strasbourg (in French). Vol. 132. Paris: Les Belles Lettres. OCLC 490250773 – via Internet Archive.
- Willcock, Malcolm M., ed. (1995). Pindar: Victory Odes. Cambridge Greek and Latin Classics. Cambridge University Press. ISBN 0-521-43636-2.
- Wolin, Richard (2022). Heidegger in Ruins: Between Philosophy and Ideology. New Haven: Yale University Press. ISBN 978-0-300-23318-6.
