= Irene Lemos =

British classical archaeologist

Irene S. Lemos FSA
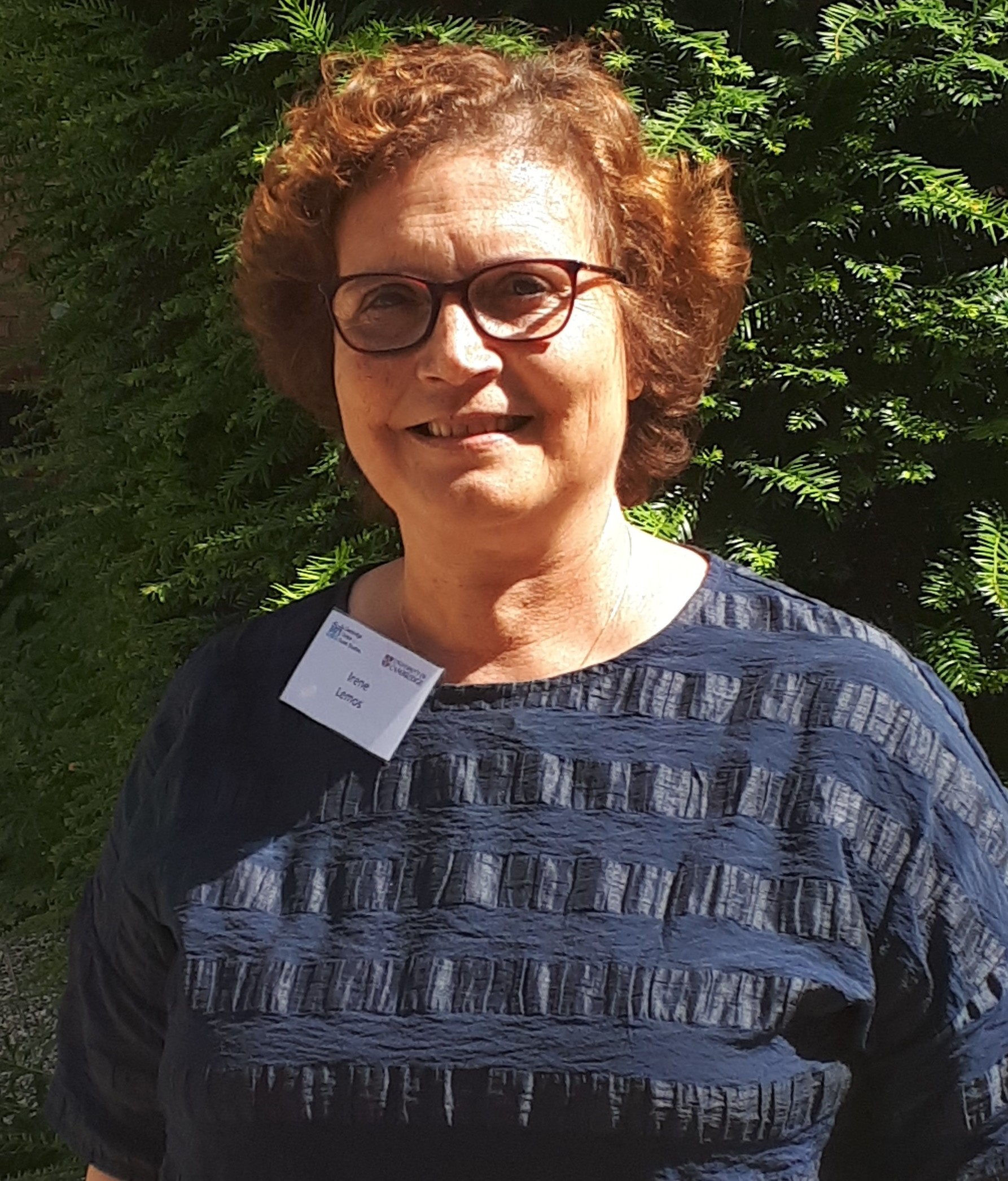
- Lemos in 2019

Academic work
- Discipline: Classical archaeology
- Sub-discipline: Aegean archaeology; Bronze Age Greece; Iron Age Greece; Greek Dark Ages; Archaic Greece
- Institutions: Somerville College, Oxford; St Peter's College, Oxford; University of Edinburgh; Merton College, Oxford

Irene S. Lemos FSA is a British classical archaeologist and academic, specialising in the Late Bronze Age and Early Iron Age of Greece. She is Professor of Classical Archaeology at the University of Oxford, and a Fellow of Merton College, Oxford.

== Career ==
Lemos obtained her BA from the University of Athens and her doctorate from Somerville College, Oxford. Her doctoral thesis was titled "Regional characteristics in the Protogeometric Period" and was completed in 1988. After her doctorate, she got a fellowship at Somerville and St Peter's College, Oxford.

From 1995 to 2004, she was a lecturer and then reader at the University of Edinburgh. In 2004, she joined the University of Oxford as a Reader in Classical Archaeology and a Fellow of Merton College, Oxford. She was appointed Professor in Classical Archaeology in 2007.

She is a corresponding member of the German Archaeological Institute, a fellow of the Society of Antiquaries of London. She was the Archaeological Institute of America Kress Lecturer and the Australian Archaeological Institute at Athens Professorial Research Fellow in 2014.

Lemos has directed excavations at Lefkandi since 2003.

== Selected publications ==
- I. S. Lemos, 2015. "The Missing Dead: Late Geometric Burials at Lefkandi" in Mediterranean Archaeology pp. 159–172.
- I. S. Lemos, 2014'Communities in transformation: an archaeological survey from the 12th to the 9th century BC', Pharos 20. 1, 2014, pp. 163–194.
- I. S. Lemos, 2003. The Protogeometric Aegean: The Archaeology of the Late Eleventh and Tenth Centuries BC. Oxford: OUP.
- Popham, M. R. and I. S. Lemos 1996. Lefkandi III, 1, The Toumba Cemetery, The excavations of 1981, 1984, 1986 and 1994. Supplement of the British School at Athens, Oxford
- Tsingarida, A. and I. S. Lemos 2017. Constructing social identities in early Iron Age and archaic Greece. Brussels : CReA-Patrimoine.
