= Wilhelm Ternite =

German painter

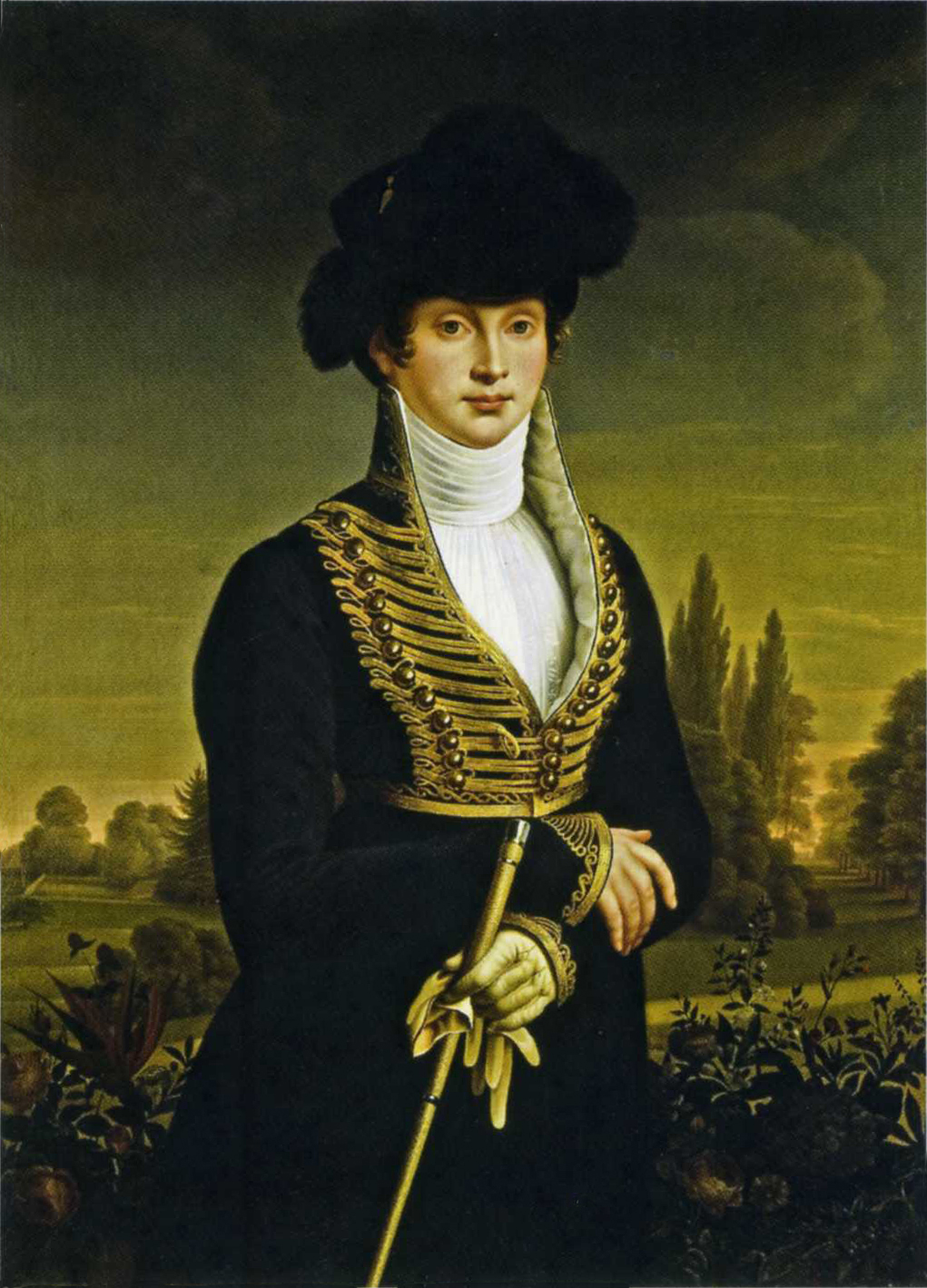
Queen Louise in a riding habit (c.1810)

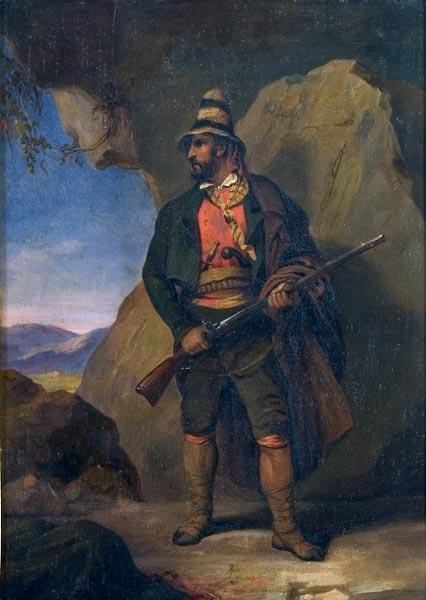
Italian Brigand

Friedrich Wilhelm Ternite (5 September 1786 – 22 October 1871) was a German portrait painter, miniaturist and lithographer. In Berlin, he served as a court painter and inspector of the Royal Art Gallery.

== Biography ==
He was born in Neustrelitz. As early as 1803, he took drawing lessons at the Prussian Academy of Arts with Friedrich Georg Weitsch. After 1810, he received financial support from King Friedrich Wilhelm III and became the King's portrait painter.

In the German Campaign of 1813, he was a volunteer army officer and was among the Prussian troops that entered Paris in 1814. On the recommendation of Karl August von Hardenberg, the King commissioned him to head the unit charged with recovering art treasures that had been looted from Germany during the French occupation. He was also part of the group authorized to acquire 158 paintings from the "Giustiniani Collection" at the Louvre. These, together with the recovered works, became the basis for the Royal Art Gallery (now part of the Gemäldegalerie).

With the King's support, Ternite remained in Paris until 1823, continuing his artistic education in the workshops of Jacques-Louis David and Antoine-Jean Gros. He also produced illustrations for Mariä Krönung und die Wunder des heiligen Dominicus by August Wilhelm Schlegel and made several copies of works by Raphael.

Upon returning to Germany, he made the acquaintance of Count Gustav Adolf Wilhelm von Ingenheim, a collector of early Italian art, and accompanied him to Rome. There, he discovered some previously unknown frescoes by Andrea Mantegna. He later visited Naples and made drawings of the ruins at Herculaneum and Pompeii. These were published at the urging of the Archaeologist, Karl August Böttiger, although the interest in Greek and Roman art was diminishing at the time they appeared.

In 1826, he went back to work as a portrait painter for the Royal Family and became a member of the Berlin Art Society. Shortly after, he was appointed "Master of the Royal Works of Art" (inspector of the Royal Collection); a position he held until his retirement in 1864. In 1860, he was awarded the Order of the Red Eagle. He died in 1871, in Potsdam.
