= Young Spartans Exercising =

Painting by Edgar Degas

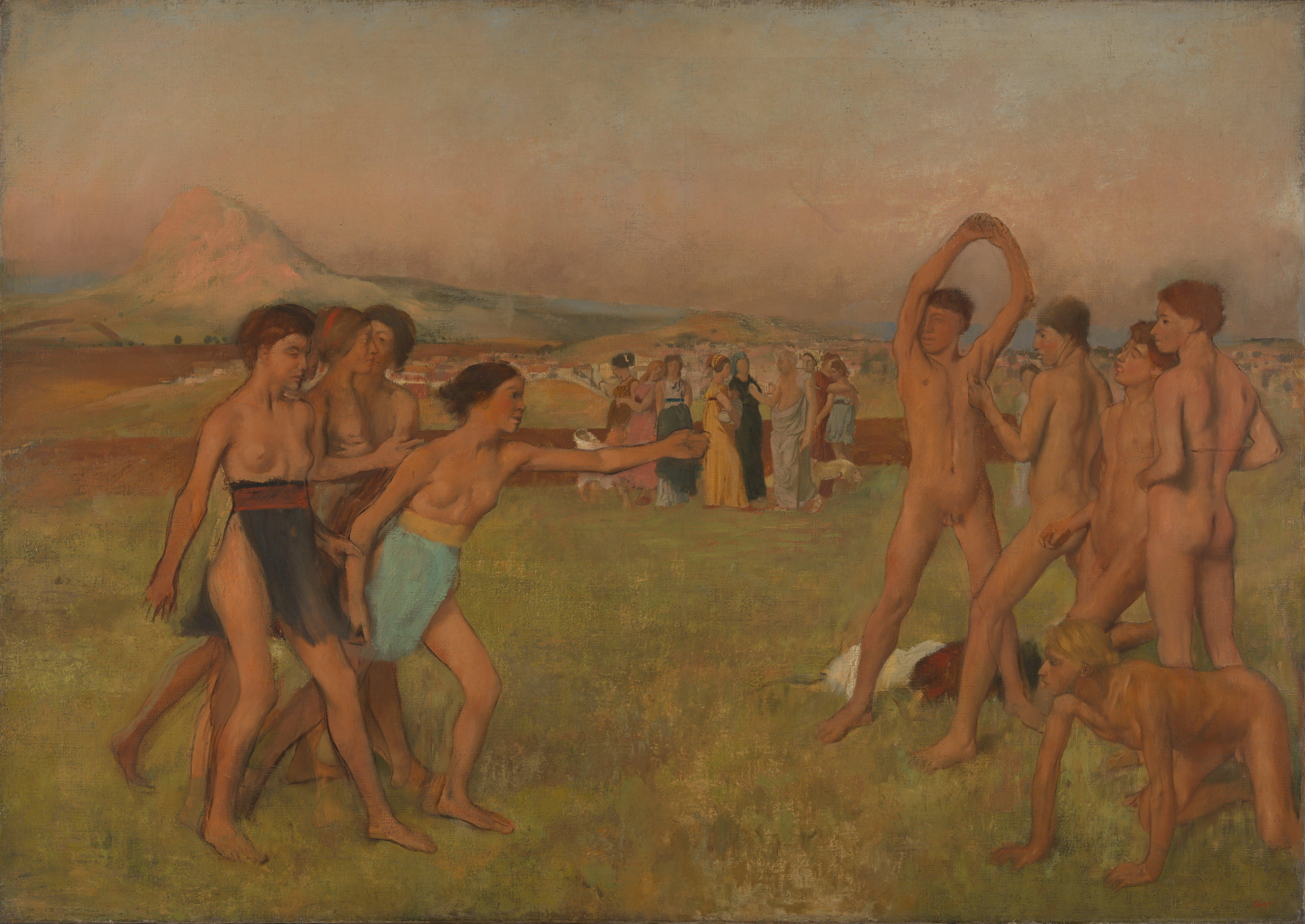
- Artist: Edgar Degas
- Year: c. 1860
- Medium: Oil on canvas
- Dimensions: 109.5 cm × 155 cm (43.1 in × 61 in)
- Location: National Gallery, London

Young Spartans Exercising, also known as Young Spartans and as Young Spartan Girls Challenging Boys, is an early oil on canvas painting by French impressionist artist Edgar Degas. The work depicts two groups of male and female Spartan youth exercising and challenging each other in some way. The work was purchased by the trustees of the Courtauld fund in 1924 and is now in the permanent collection of the National Gallery in London.

== Description ==
The painting depicts as its subject matter two groups of adolescents, five girls (one of which is almost entirely obscured by the others) and five boys, with the girls apparently taunting or beckoning the boys. The girls are positioned on the left side of the painting and the boys on the right, while in the background stands a group of women and one man (identified as the mothers of the children and Lycurgus) watching them. The women are fully clothed, while the girls and the man are topless and the boys are entirely nude. Behind the onlookers stands the city of Sparta, dominated by Mount Taygetus, from which the bodies of the society's unfit children were supposedly thrown into a ravine to die from trauma or exposure.

== History ==
The painting was begun in 1860 with Degas returning to the canvas to rework the piece over the following years, though it remained unfinished upon the artist's death. X-rays taken of the work during the early 21st century have revealed that Degas changed the positioning of the youths, their faces, and even their number; this last change resulted in the strange image of the four women in the foreground having ten legs among them. Degas' revisitation of the faces of the young people is often mentioned in art criticism, as it is believed the artist changed the features of the youths from the classic handsome Greek ideal, to a more urban modernistic look. The French art historian André Lemoisne, was first to note this fact, remarking that the subjects had a contemporary Parisian look, more akin to the "gamins of Montmartre". More recent critics agree with Lemoisne, believing Degas was attempting to "update" his painting.

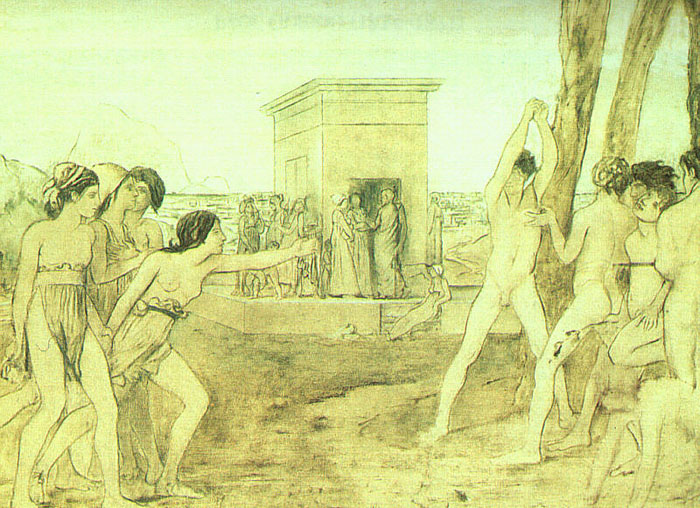
The study in the Art Institute of Chicago

A second full-scale version of the painting exists, held by the Art Institute of Chicago. This version is much less finished, but it shows a vastly different background, with a more detailed landscape and a large architectural structure, around which the characters in the background are resting. The work also shows how Degas changed the number of foreground figures with an additional boy on the right of the painting.

Young Spartans Exercising was purchased by the National Gallery in 1924. As of February 2025 it is displayed in Room 41.

== Criticism ==
In 1879, Italian art critic Diego Martelli described the unfinished work as "one of the most classicizing paintings imaginable"; though after Martelli's remarks, Degas returned to the painting and removed the classicizing architecture.

In a 1985 edition of The Art Bulletin, art critic Carol Salus hypothesises that the work "has traditionally been interpreted as representing young women challenging young men to wrestle or race, is instead a presentation of Spartan courtship rites". This position was challenged in the same publication the following year, with Linda Nochlin arguing that the work could encompass a variety of meanings, and by referring to Degas' own reluctance to explain the work in any great detail, allows the viewer to interpret the work to their own merit. This view is echoed by Christopher Riopelle, curator of 19th-century painting at the National Gallery, who in 2004, stated that the painting "starts as a traditional historical painting, closely based on classical accounts and meticulous research. It ends as something much more enigmatic."
