= Bernhard Schweitzer =

German classical archeologist

Bernhard Schweitzer (3 October 1892, in Wesel – 16 July 1966, in Tübingen) was a German classical archeologist.

== Life ==
From 1911-1917, he studied classical archaeology and philology in Heidelberg and Berlin. He received his doctorate in 1917 in Heidelberg under Friedrich von Duhn with a thesis on "Studies on the chronology of the geometric styles in Greece I". In 1921, Bernhard Schweitzer studied in Heidelberg and in 1925 became a professor. He succeeded Herbert Koch in Leipzig.

In November 1933, he was one of the signers of the Confession of Professors at German universities and colleges to Adolf Hitler and the National Socialist state. Schweitzer was not a member of the Nazi party, but only joined its affiliated social welfare organization, the National Socialist People's Welfare (Nationalsozialistische Volkswohlfahrt), in 1937. In 1945, he became the first rector of the University of Leipzig to the end of the war. In 1948, he was the successor of Carl Watzinger at Tübingen, where he retired in 1960.

== Writings ==
- Herakles. Aufsätze zur griechischen Religions- und Sagengeschichte (Tübingen 1922)
- Der bildende Künstler und der Begriff des Künstlerischen in der Antike (Heidelberg 1925)
- Xenokrates von Athen. Beiträge zur Geschichte der antiken Kunstforschung und Kunstanschauung (Königsberg 1932)
- Studien zur Entstehung des Porträts bei den Griechen (Leipzig 1940)
- Das Menschenbild der griechischen Plastik (Potsdam 1944)
- Die Bildniskunst der römischen Republik (Leipzig 1948)
- Die geometrische Kunst Griechenlands. Frühe Formenwelt im Zeitalter Homers (Köln 1969)
- Zur Kunst der Antike I-II. Ausgewählte Schriften (Tübingen 1963)

== Literature ==
- Werner Fuchs: Bernhard Schweitzer 1892–1966. In: Reinhard Lullies/ Wolfgang Schiering (Hrsg.) Archäologenbildnisse. Porträts und Kurzbiographien von Klassischen Archäologen deutscher Sprache. von Zabern, Mainz 1988, S. 258–259, ISBN 3-8053-0971-6.
- Ulrich Hausmann: Bernhard Schweitzer †. In: Gnomon 38 (1966), S. 844–847.
- Stefanie Müller: Schweitzer, Bernhard, Wer war wer in der DDR? 5. Ausgabe. Band 2, Ch. Links, Berlin 2010, ISBN 978-3-86153-561-4.
- Hanna Philipp, Ingeborg Scheibler (2010). "Schweitzer, Heinrich Eduard Stephan Bernhard Robert". Neue Deutsche Biographie (in German). Vol. 24. Berlin: Duncker & Humblot. pp. 58–59. (full text online).
- Helga A. Welsh: Entnazifizierung und Wiedereröffnung der Universität Leipzig 1945-1946. Ein Bericht des damaligen Rektors Professor Bernhard Schweitzer, In: Vierteljahrshefte für Zeitgeschichte, Jahrgang 33, 1985, Heft 2, S. 339-372. (online; PDF; 1,6 MB)
