= Vincent Desborough =

English historian

Vincent Robin d'Arba Desborough, FBA, FSA (19 July 1914 – 24 July 1978) was an English historian and archaeologist. His is credited with naming the Greek Dark Ages.

== Life and career ==
Born on 19 July 1914 at Tunbridge Wells, Desborough's father was Latvian and his mother British. He was schooled in France and Switzerland before attending St Augustine's in Ramsgate and Downside School. He then studied classics at New College, Oxford, from 1932, graduating in the second class in 1936. He completed the BLitt at Oxford under Sir John Myres's supervision. In 1937, he was awarded the Macmillan Studentship by the British School at Athens; his research there allowed him to complete his BLitt in 1939, taking the Charles Oldham Prize; the degree was awarded in 1940.

Desborough served in the Second World War in the infantry and then the Royal Artillery, rising to the rank of Captain. From 1944 until he was demobilised in 1946, he served in Greece. He was then a member of the British Council in the country and in 1947 he became assistant director of the British School at Athens. The next year, he returned to England to take up an assistant lectureship at the University of Manchester. He was subsequently promoted to a lectureship, senior lectureship and, in 1967, a readership. He left Manchester in 1968 to take up a senior research fellowship in ancient history at New College, Oxford.

== Legacy ==
Desborough is credited with naming the Greek Dark Ages. He explored this period in his books Protogeometric Pottery (1952), The Last Mycenaeans and Their Successors (1964) and The Greek Dark Ages (1972). He was elected a fellow of the Society of Antiquaries of London in 1956 and a fellow of the British Academy in 1966. He died on 24 July 1978.
