= Robert Drews =

American historian (born 1936)

- Born: March 26, 1936 (age 90)
- Education: Northwestern College (BA); University of Missouri (MA); Johns Hopkins University (PhD)
- Occupation: Historian

Robert Drews (born March 26, 1936) is an American historian who is Professor of Classical Studies Emeritus at Vanderbilt University. He received his B.A. from Northwestern College, his M.A. from University of Missouri and his Ph.D. from Johns Hopkins University. Drews specializes in ancient history and prehistory, in particular the evolution of warfare and of religion.

== Works ==
- The Greek Accounts of Eastern History. Cambridge, Massachusetts: Harvard University Press, for the Center for Hellenic Studies, 1973
- Basileus: The Evidence for Kingship in Geometric Greece. New Haven: Yale University Press, 1983
- In Search of the Shroud of Turin: New Light on its History and Origins. Totowa, N. J.: Rowman and Allanheld, 1984.
- The Coming Of The Greeks: Indo-European Conquests in the Aegean and The Near East. Princeton: Princeton University Press, 1988.
- The End of The Bronze Age: Changes in Warfare and the Catastrophe ca. 1200 B.C. Princeton: Princeton University Press, 1993.
- (editor) Greater Anatolia and the Indo-Hittite Language Family. Papers presented at a colloquium hosted by the University of Richmond, March 18–19, 2000. Washington, D.C.: Institute for the Study of Man, 2001.
- Early Riders: The Beginnings of Mounted Warfare in Asia and Europe. London: Routledge, 2004.
- Militarism and the Indo-Europeanizing of Europe. London: Routledge, 2017.
