= Greek Dark Ages =

Era in Greece from (c. 1200 – c. 800 BC)

- Geographical range: Greek mainland and Aegean Sea
- Period: Ancient Greece
- Dates: c. 1180–800 BC
- Characteristics: Destruction of settlements and collapse of the socioeconomic system
- Preceded by: Mycenaean Greece, Minoan civilization
- Followed by: Archaic Greece

The Greek Dark Ages (c. 1180–800 BC) was a period in Ancient Greece that was characterized by the collapse of Mycenaean civilization, where the palaces and cities of the Mycenaeans were either destroyed, abandoned, or both. This period was part of the Late Bronze Age collapse, which affected much of the Eastern Mediterranean.

At around the same time, the Hittite civilization in Asia Minor (modern-day Turkey) also suffered serious disruption and collapse, with cities such as Troy being destroyed. Moreover, in Egypt, the New Kingdom fell into disarray, leading to the Third Intermediate Period of Egypt. Following this mass destruction, there were fewer, smaller settlements, which suggests widespread famine and depopulation. On the Greek mainland, the Linear B script, used by Mycenaean bureaucrats to write the Greek language, ceased to be used. The later Greek alphabet did not develop until hundreds of years later, in the beginning of the Protohistoric Iron Age, c. 800 BC.

== Postpalatial Bronze Age ==
Mycenaean palaces began to come to an end around 1200 BC, and the process concluded decades later, due to internal tensions within the cities which rejected palatial authority and administration, patent in the disappearance of Linear B writing and palatial architecture. There were also conflicts, in the region of Boeotia, between Mycenaean polities like Orchomenos, Gla, and Thebes. Although Thebes and Eleon had an important reoccupation pattern even in Late Helladic IIIC Middle, c. 1170–1100 BC, when other minor sites around also began to rise, palaces had ceased to exist along with art and burial customs.

On the other hand, in the island of Euboea, the site of Lefkandi grew up in an accelerated way in this Postpalatial period (1200–1050 BC) to become a preeminent place as it has a double bay with sea traffic. Additionally, evidence had emerged of the new presence of Hellenes in sub-Mycenaean Cyprus (c. 1100–1050 BC) and on the Syrian coast at Al-Mina. Greek-speaking people arrived in Cyprus in the late 13th to 11th centuries BC, but did not colonize the island, instead integrating into society as "economic and cultural migrants from the periphery to the core."

== Early Iron Age ==
There were four centres in the following Prehistoric or Early Iron Age (1050–800 BC), with more than 1000 residents: Lefkandi, Athens, Argos, and Knossos, which also featured sociopolitical complexity, hierarchies manifested locally though not in a wider area. The decoration on Greek pottery after about 1050 BC lacks the figurative decoration of Mycenaean ware and is restricted to simpler, generally geometric styles: Early Protogeometric (1050–1000 BC), Middle Protogeometric (1000–950 BC), Late Protogeometric (950 BC - 900 BC), Early Geometric (900 BC - 850 BC), and Middle Geometric (850–800 BC). Thomas R. Martin considers that between 950 BC and 750 BC, the Greeks relearned how to write, but using the alphabet of the Phoenicians instead of the Linear B script used by the Mycenaeans, innovating in a fundamental way by introducing vowels as letters. "The Greek version of the alphabet eventually formed the base of the alphabet used for English today."

It was previously thought that all contact was lost between mainland Hellenes and foreign powers during this period, yielding little cultural progress or growth. But archaeologist Alex Knodell considers that artifacts of the Early Iron Age, from excavations at Lefkandi on the Lelantine Plain in the island of Euboea in the 1980s, "revealed that some parts of Greece were much wealthier and more widely connected than traditionally thought, as a monumental building and its adjacent cemetery showed connections to Cyprus, Egypt, and the Levant as markers of elite status and authority, much as they had been in previous periods," and this shows that significant cultural and trade links with the east, particularly the Levant coast, developed from c. 900 BC onwards.

Though life was harsh for the Greeks of the Dark Ages, and one major result of the period was the deconstruction of the old Mycenaean economic and social structures, along with the strict class hierarchies and hereditary rule forgotten, a gradual replacement with new socio-political institutions eventually allowed for the rise of democracy in 5th century BC Athens. Notable events after the Dark Ages that mark the transition to Classical Antiquity include the first Olympics, in 776 BC, and the composition of the Homeric epics the Iliad and the Odyssey.

== Mediterranean warfare and Sea Peoples ==
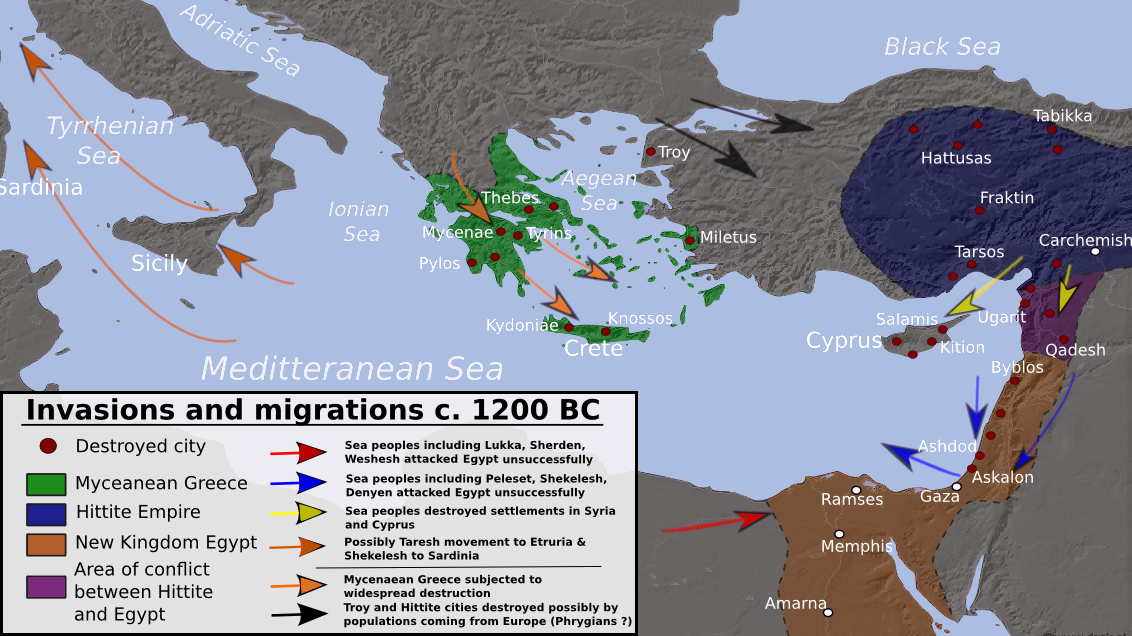
Map of the Late Bronze Age collapse (c. 1200 BC) in the Eastern Mediterranean

The fall of Mycenaeans in the Bronze Age collapse was attributed to a Dorian or Sea Peoples invasion, but Sea Peoples could have been pirate bands which coalesced due to the collapse, and diverse in origin, like sailors, workers, or mercenaries, coming from ethnicities like those of the Lukka lands, but not necessarily or exclusively Achaeans (Ekwesh).

Around this time, c. 1200–1150 BC, large-scale revolts took place in several parts of the eastern Mediterranean. Writing in 2013, Jonathan Hall considered that: "[T]he collapse of the political and economic system centered on the Mycenaean palaces provoked a climate of instability and insecurity and [s]ome people – whether for reasons of safety or economic necessity – decided to abandon their former homes and seek a living elsewhere."

== Culture ==
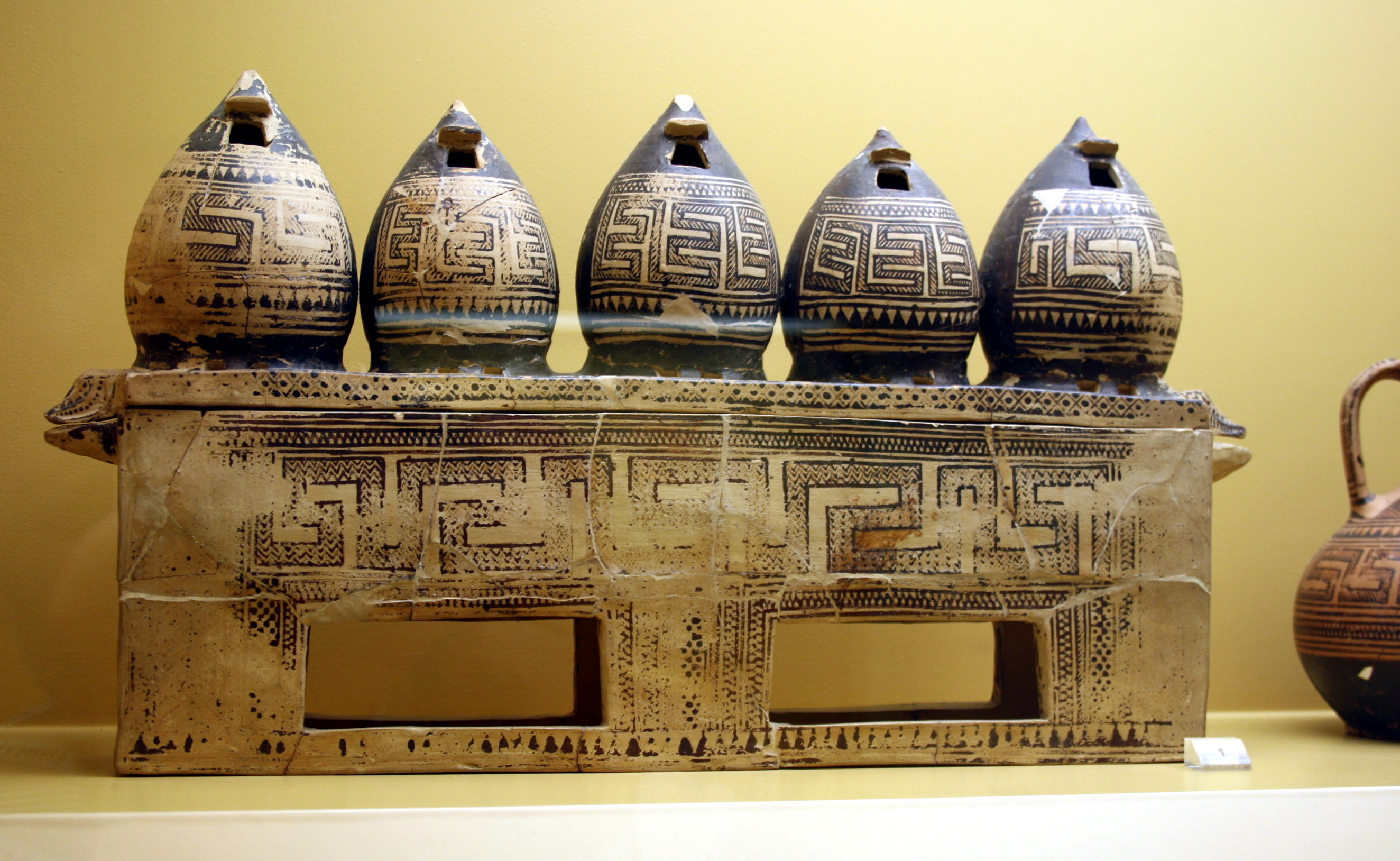
Geometric-style box in the shape of a barn. On display in the Ancient Agora Museum in Athens, housed in the Stoa of Attalus. From early geometric cremation burial of a wealthy pregnant woman, 850 BC.

With the collapse of the palatial centers, no more monumental stone buildings were built, and the practice of wall painting may have ceased. Writing in the Linear B script also ceased, and vital trade links were lost as towns and villages were abandoned. Writing in the Linear B script ended particularly due to the redistributive palace economy crashing; there was no longer a need to keep records about commerce. The population of Greece declined. The world of organized state armies, kings, officials, and redistributive systems disappeared. Most of the information about the period comes from burial sites and the grave goods contained within them.

The emerging fragmented, localized, and autonomous cultures lacked cultural and aesthetic cohesion and are noted for their diversity of material cultures in pottery styles (e.g. conservative in Athens, eclectic in Knossos), burial practices, and settlement structures. The Protogeometric style of pottery was stylistically simpler than earlier designs, characterized by lines and curves. On the other hand, generalizations about the "Dark Age Society" are considered simplifications, because the range of cultures throughout Greece at the time cannot be grouped into a single "Dark Age Society" category.

Tholos tombs are found in Early Iron Age Thessaly and in Crete but not in general elsewhere, and cremation was the dominant rite in Attica but nearby in the Argolid, it was burial. Some former sites of Mycenaean palaces, such as Argos or Knossos, continued to be occupied; the fact that other sites experienced an expansive "boom time" of a generation or two before they were abandoned has been associated by James Whitley with the "big-man social organization", which is based on personal charisma and is inherently unstable: he interprets Lefkandi in this light.

Some regions in Greece, such as Attica, Euboea, and central Crete, recovered economically from these events faster than others, but life for common Greeks would have remained relatively unchanged as it had for centuries. There was still farming, weaving, metalworking and pottery but at a lower level of output and for local use in local styles. Some technical innovations were introduced around 1050 BC with the start of the Protogeometric style (1050 BC – 900 BC), such as the superior pottery technology that included a faster potter's wheel for superior vase shapes and the use of a compass to draw perfect circles and semicircles for decoration. Better glazes were achieved by higher temperature firing of the clay. However, the overall trend was toward simpler, less intricate pieces and fewer resources being devoted to the creation of beautiful art.

The smelting of iron was learned from Cyprus and the Levant and was exploited and improved upon by using local deposits of iron ore previously ignored by the Mycenaeans: edged weapons were now within reach of less elite warriors. Though the universal use of iron was one shared feature among Dark Age settlements, it is still uncertain when the forged iron weapons and armour achieved strength superior to those that had previously been cast and hammered from bronze. From 1050, many small local iron industries appeared, and by 900, almost all weapons in grave goods were made of iron.

The distribution of the Ionic Greek dialect in historic times indicates early movement from mainland Greece to the Anatolian coast to such sites as Miletus, Ephesus, and Colophon, perhaps as early as 1000 BC, but contemporaneous evidence is scant. In Cyprus, some archaeological sites begin to show identifiably Greek ceramics; a colony of Euboean Greeks was established at Al Mina on the Syrian coast, and the revival of an Aegean Greek network of exchange can be detected from 10th-century BC Attic Proto-geometric pottery found in Crete and at Samos, off the coast of Asia Minor.

Religion in the Greek Dark Ages is seen to be a continuation of Bronze Age Greek Religion, specifically the ideas of Hero worship, and how the gods' powers were attributed.

== Post-Mycenaean Cyprus ==
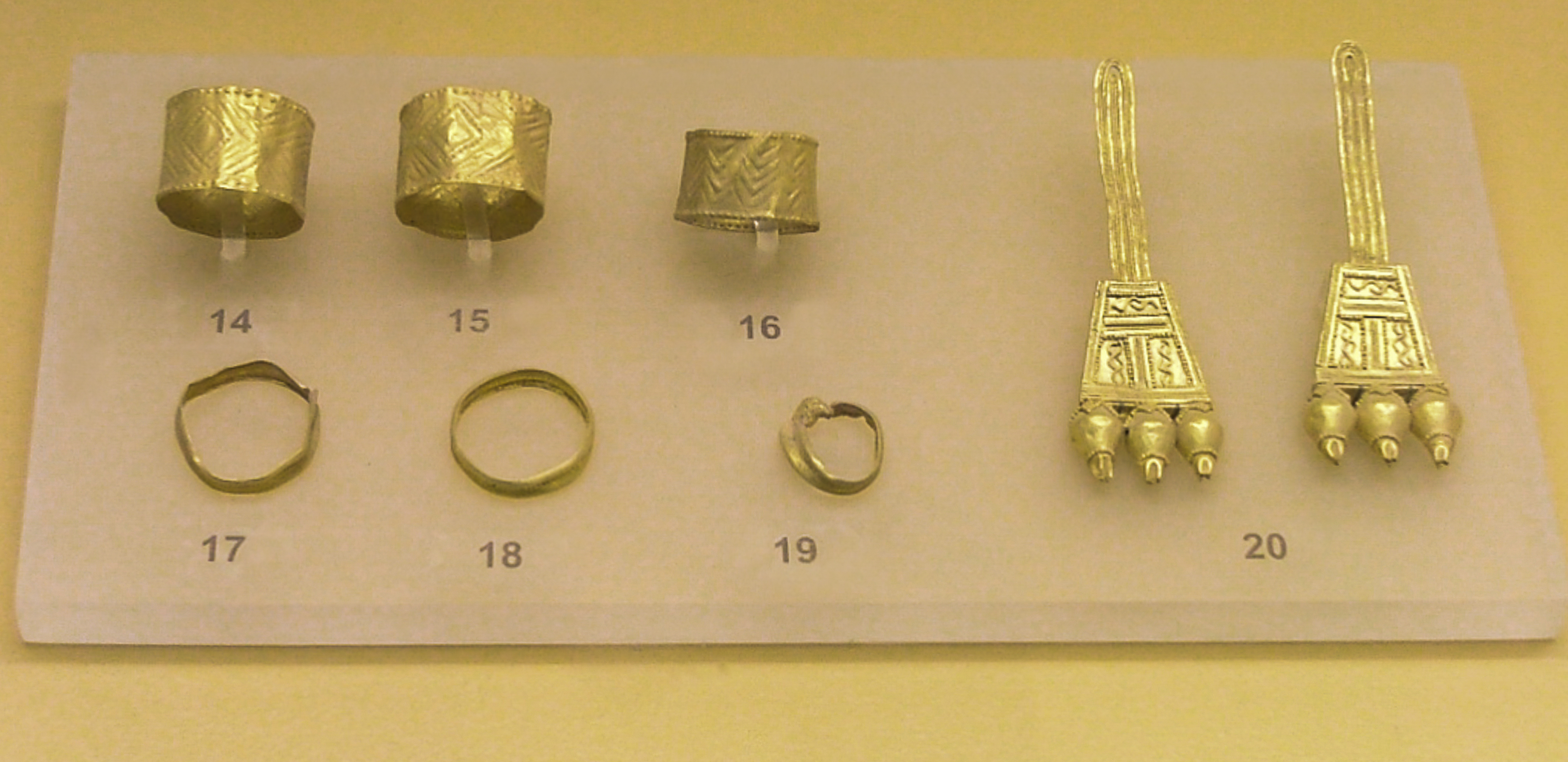
Finds from an early Geometric cremation burial of a pregnant wealthy woman, from the N.W. of the Areopagus, about 850 BC, Ancient Agora Museum (Athens); exhibit 14–16: broad gold finger rings; exhibit 17–19: gold finger rings; 20: pair of gold earrings with trapezoid endings

Cyprus was inhabited by a mix of "Pelasgians" and Phoenicians, joined during this period by the first Greek settlements. Potters in Cyprus initiated the most elegant new pottery style of the 10th and 9th centuries, the "Cypro-Phoenician" "black on red" style of small flasks and jugs that held precious contents, probably scented oil. Together with distinctively Greek Euboean ceramic wares, it was widely exported and is found in Levantine sites, including Tyre and far inland in the late 11th and 10th centuries. Cypriot metalwork was exchanged in Crete.

== Society ==
Greece during this period was likely divided into independent regions organized by kinship groups and the oikoi or households, the origins of the later poleis. Most Greeks did not live in isolated farmsteads but in small settlements. It is likely that at the dawn of the historical period two or three hundred years later, the main economic resource for each family was the ancestral plot of land of the Oikos, the kleros or allotment. Without this, a man could not marry.

Excavations of Dark Age communities such as Nichoria in the Peloponnese have shown how a Bronze Age town was abandoned in 1150 BC but then reemerged as a small village cluster by 1075 BC. At this time there were only around forty families living there with plenty of good farming land and grazing for cattle. The remains of a 10th century BC building, including a megaron, on the top of the ridge has led to speculation that this was the chieftain's house. This was a larger structure than those surrounding it but it was still made from the same materials (mud brick and thatched roof). It was perhaps also a place of religious significance and communal storage of food. High-status individuals did in fact exist in the Dark Age, but their standard of living was not significantly higher than others of their village.

== Lefkandi burial ==
Lefkandi on the island of Euboea was a prosperous settlement in the Late Bronze Age, possibly to be identified with old Eretria. It recovered quickly from the collapse of Mycenaean culture, and in 1981 excavators of a burial ground found the largest 10th century BC building yet known from Greece. Sometimes called "the heroon", this long narrow building, 50 metres by 10 metres, or about 164 feet by 33 feet, contained two burial shafts. In one were placed four horses and the other contained a cremated male buried with his iron weapons and an inhumed woman, heavily adorned with gold jewellery.

The man's bones were placed in a bronze jar from Cyprus, with hunting scenes on the cast rim. The woman was clad with gold coils in her hair, rings, gold breastplates, an heirloom necklace, an elaborate Cypriot or Near Eastern necklace made some 200 to 300 years before her burial, and an ivory-handled dagger at her head. The horses appeared to have been sacrificed, some appearing to have iron bits in their mouths. No evidence survives to show whether the building was erected to house the burial, or whether the "hero" or local chieftain in the grave was cremated and then buried in his grand house; whichever is true, the house was soon demolished and the debris used to form a roughly circular mound over the wall stumps.

Between this period and approximately 820 BC, rich members of the community were cremated and buried close to the eastern end of the building, in much the same way Christians might seek to be buried close to a saint's grave; the presence of imported objects, notable throughout more than eighty further burials, contrast with other nearby cemeteries at Lefkandi and attest to a lasting elite tradition.

== End ==
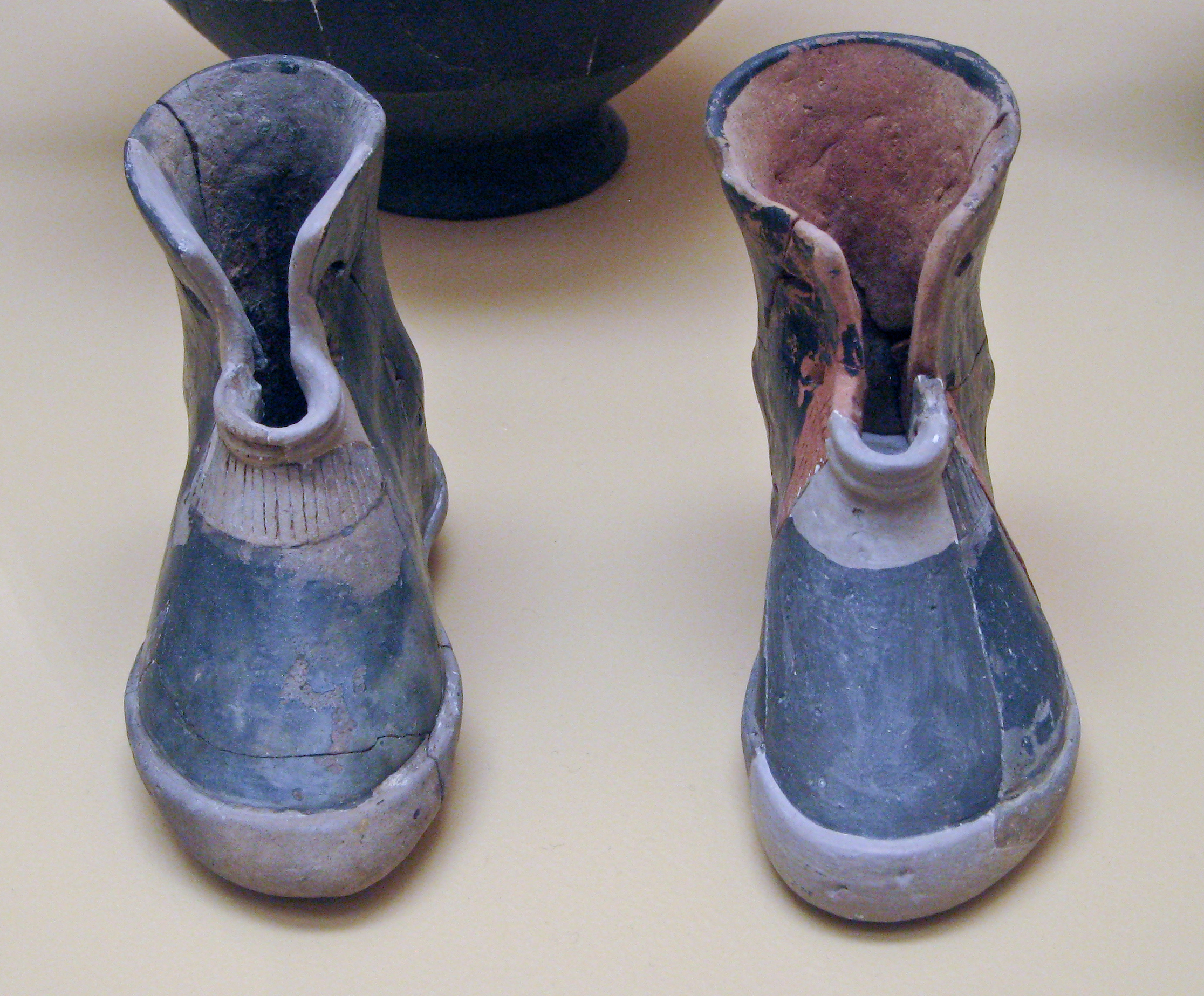
An Ancient Greek pair of terracotta boots. Early geometric period cremation burial of a woman, 900 BC. Ancient Agora Museum in Athens.

The archaeological record of many sites demonstrates that the economic recovery of Greece was well underway by the beginning of the 8th century BC. Cemeteries, such as the Kerameikos in Athens or Lefkandi, and sanctuaries, such as Olympia, recently founded in Delphi or the Heraion of Samos, first of the colossal free-standing temples, were richly provided with offerings – including items from the Near East, Egypt, and Italy made of exotic materials including amber and ivory. Exports of Greek pottery demonstrate contact with the Levant coast at sites such as Al-Mina and with the region of the Villanovan culture to the north of Rome.

The decoration of pottery became more elaborate and included figured scenes that parallel the stories of Homeric Epics. Iron tools and weapons improved. Renewed Mediterranean trade brought new supplies of copper and tin to make a wide range of elaborate bronze objects, such as tripod stands like those offered as prizes in the funeral games celebrated by Achilles for Patroclus. Other coastal regions of Greece besides Euboea were once again full participants in the commercial and cultural exchanges of the eastern and central Mediterranean and communities developed governance by an elite group of aristocrats, rather than by the single basileus or chieftain of earlier periods.

== New writing system ==
By the beginning of 8th century BC, a new Greek alphabet system was adopted from the Phoenician alphabet by a Greek with first-hand experience of it. The Greeks adapted the abjad used to write Phoenician, a Semitic language used by the Phoenicians, notably adapting the matres lectionis and certain other letters of that abjad having no corresponding sound in Greek to represent vowel sounds, thereby creating the first truly alphabetic writing system. The new alphabet quickly spread throughout the Mediterranean and was used to write not only the Greek language but also Phrygian and other languages in the eastern Mediterranean. As Greece sent out colonies west towards Sicily and Italy (Pithekoussae, Cumae), the influence of their new alphabet extended further.

The ceramic Euboean artifact inscribed with a few lines written in the Greek alphabet referring to "Nestor's Cup", discovered in a grave at Pithekoussae (Ischia), dates from c. 730 BC. It seems to be the oldest written reference to the Iliad. The Etruscans benefited from the innovation: Old Italic variants spread throughout Italy from the 8th century. Other variants of the alphabet appear on the Lemnos Stele and in the alphabets of Asia Minor. The previous Linear scripts were not completely abandoned: the Cypriot syllabary, descended from Linear A, remained in use on Cyprus in Arcadocypriot Greek and Eteocypriot inscriptions until the Hellenistic era.

== Continuity thesis ==
Some scholars have argued against the concept of a Greek Dark Age, on grounds that the former lack of archaeological evidence in a period that was mute in its lack of inscriptions (thus "dark") is an accident of discovery rather than a fact of history. As James Whitley has put it, "The Dark Age of Greece is our conception. It is a conception strongly coloured by our knowledge of the two literate civilisations that preceded and succeeded it: the bureaucratic, palace-centred world of Mycenaean Greece and the chaotic and creative Archaic age of Hellenic civilisation."

== Bibliography ==
- Bintliff, John (2012). "The Greek Early Iron Age and the Concept of a 'Dark Age'". The Complete Archaeology of Greece: From Hunter-Gatherers to the 20th Century AD, First Edition. pp. 207–233. doi:10.1002/9781118255179. ISBN 9781405154185.
- Chew, Sing C. (2001). "3, The second-millennium Bronze Age: Crete and Mycenaean Greece 1700 BC – 1200 BC". World Ecological Degradation: Accumulation, Urbanization and Deforestation 3000 BC ‒ AD 2000. Rowman Altamira. ISBN 0-7591-0031-4.
- Coldstream, John Nicolas (2003). Geometric Greece: 900-700 BC Second Edition (PDF). London: Routledge. ISBN 0-415-29899-7.
- Desborough, V.R.d'A. (1972). The Greek Dark Ages. St. Martin's Press.
- Dickinson, Oliver (2006). The Aegean from Bronze Age to Iron Age: Continuity and Change Between the Twelfth and Eighth Centuries BC. New York: Routledge. ISBN 0-4151-3589-3.
- Faucounau, Jean (2003). Les Peuples de la Mer et leur histoire (in French). Paris: L'Harmattan.
- Fox, Robin Lane (4 September 2008). Travelling Heroes: Greeks and their myths in the epic age of Homer. Penguin UK. ISBN 978-0-14-188986-3.
- Hall, Jonathan (2013). A History of the Archaic Greek World (second ed.). Wiley. ISBN 978-1-118-30127-2.
- Hurwitt, Jeffrey M. (1985). The Art and Culture of Early Greece 1100–480 BC. Cornell University Press. Chapters 1–3.
- Knapp, A. Bernard (November 23, 2022). "Bronze Age Cyprus and the Aegean: 'exotic currency' and objects of connectivity". Journal of Greek Archaeology. 7 (7): 69–93. doi:10.32028/jga.v7i.1711.
- Knodell, Alex R. (2021). Societies in Transition in Early Greece: An Archaeological History. Oakland: University of California Press. ISBN 978-0-5203-8053-0.
- Langdon, Susan (2010). Art and Identity in Dark Age Greece, 1100–700 BC. Cambridge University Press.
- Latacz, J. (1994). "Between Troy and Homer : The so-called Dark Ages in Greece". Storia, Poesia e Pensiero nel Mondo antico. Studi in Onore di M. Gigante. Rome: Bibliopolis.
- McDonald, William A. (1972). "Excavations at Nichoria in Messenia: 1969-71" (PDF). Hesperia. 41 (2): 218–273. JSTOR 147682.
- McDonald, William A. (1975). Excavations at Nichoria in Messenia: 1972-1973 (PDF).
- Snodgrass, Anthony M. (1971). The dark age of Greece: an archaeological survey of the eleventh to the eighth centuries BC. Edinburgh: Edinburgh University Press. ISBN 0852240899.
- Sandars, N.K. (c. 1978). The Sea Peoples: Warriors of the ancient Mediterranean 1250–1150 BC. London: Thames and Hudson. ISBN 0-500-02085-X.
- Whitley, James (1991). Style and Society in Dark Age Greece: The Changing Face of a Pre-literate Society 1100–700 BC (New Studies in Archaeology). Cambridge: Cambridge University Press. ISBN 0-5213-7383-2.
