= Coin =

Small, flat and usually round piece of material used as money

Currency

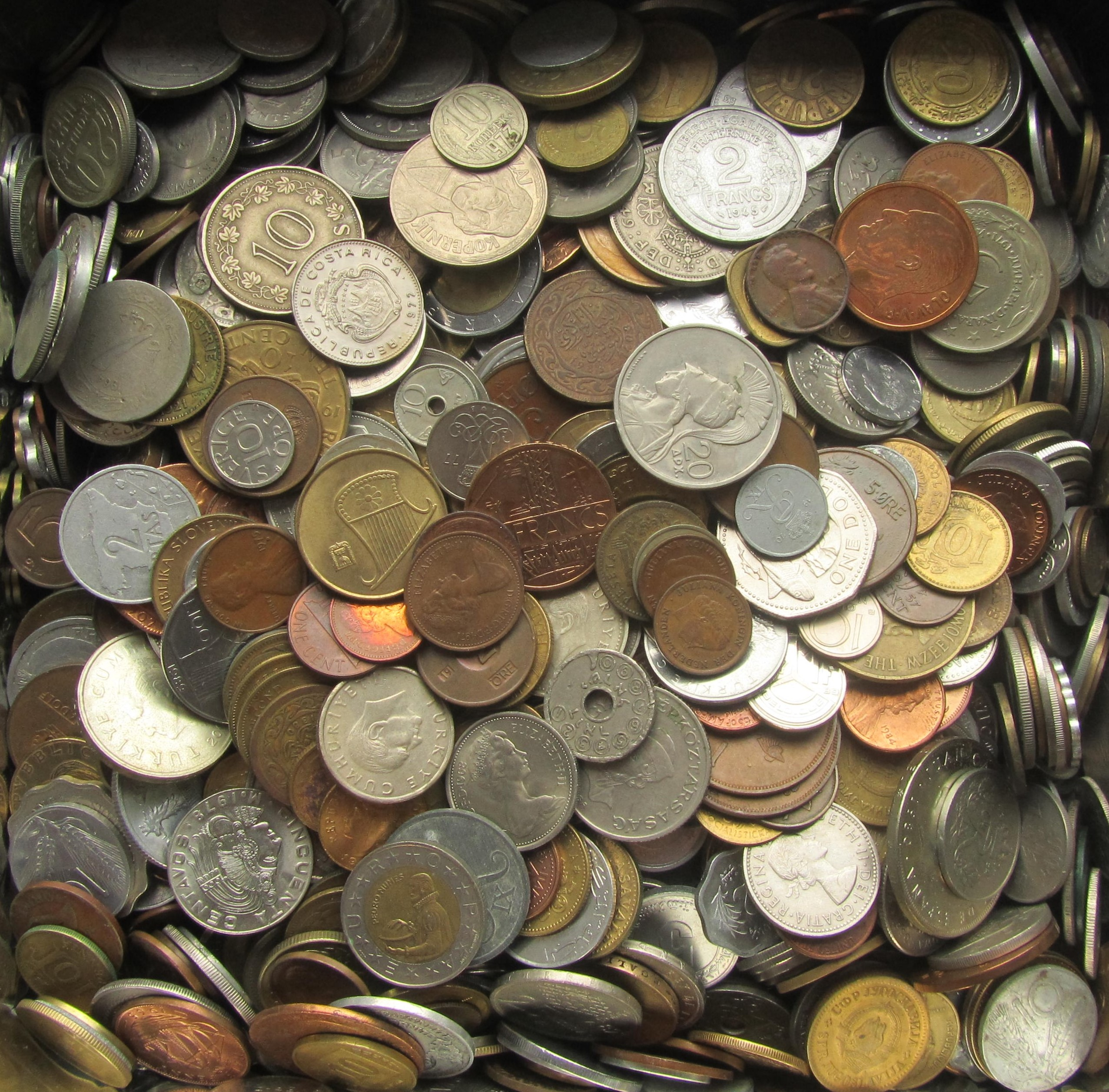
A selection of metal coins

A coin is a small object, usually round and flat, used primarily as a medium of exchange or legal tender. They are standardized in weight, and produced in large quantities at a mint in order to facilitate trade. They are most often issued by a government. Coins often have images, numerals, or text on them. The faces of coins or medals are sometimes called the obverse and the reverse, referring to the front and back sides, respectively. The obverse of a coin is commonly called heads, because it often depicts the head of a prominent person, and the reverse is known as tails.

The first metal coins – invented in the ancient Greek world and disseminated during the Hellenistic period – were precious metal–based, and were invented in order to simplify and regularize the task of measuring and weighing bullion (bulk metal) carried around for the purpose of transactions. They carried their value within the coins themselves, but the stampings also induced manipulations, such as the clipping of coins to remove some of the precious metal.

Most modern coinage metals are base metal, and their value comes from their status as fiat money — the value of the coin is established by law. In the last hundred years, the face value of circulated coins has occasionally been lower than the value of the metal they contain, primarily due to inflation. If the difference becomes significant, the issuing authority may decide to withdraw these coins from circulation, possibly issuing new equivalents with a different composition, or the public may decide to melt the coins down or hoard them (see Gresham's law). Currently coins are used as money in everyday transactions, circulating alongside banknotes. Usually, the highest value coin in circulation (excluding bullion coins) is worth less than the lowest-value note. Coins are usually more efficient than banknotes because they last longer: banknotes last only about four years, compared with 30 years for a coin.

Exceptions to the rule of face value being higher than content value currently occur for bullion coins made of copper, silver, or gold (and rarely other metals, such as platinum or palladium), intended for collectors or investors in precious metals. Examples of modern gold collector/investor coins include the British sovereign minted by the United Kingdom, the American Gold Eagle minted by the United States, the Canadian Gold Maple Leaf minted by Canada, and the Krugerrand, minted by South Africa. While the Eagle and Sovereign coins have nominal (purely symbolic) face values, the Krugerrand does not. Commemorative coins usually serve as collector's items only, although some countries also issue commemorative coins for regular circulation, such as the 2€ commemorative coins and U.S. America the Beautiful quarters.

== History ==
=== Tongbei in Bronze Age China (c. 1100 BC) ===
In the late Chinese Bronze Age, standardized cast tokens were made, such as those discovered in a tomb near Anyang. These were replicas in bronze of earlier Chinese currency, cowrie shells, so they were named "Bronze Shells".

=== China Henan coin factory (c. 640 – 550 BC) ===
The world's oldest known coin factory has been excavated in the ancient city Guanzhuang in Henan province in China. The factory produced shovel-shaped bronze coins between 640 B.C. and 550 B.C., making it the oldest securely dated minting site.

=== Iron Age ===
==== Lydian and Ionian electrum coins (c. 600 BC) ====
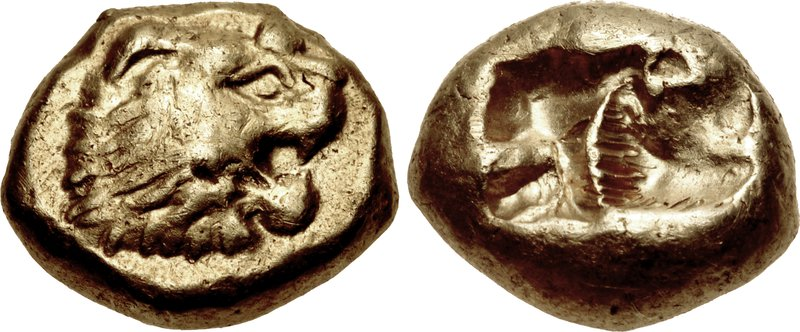
Coin of Alyattes of Lydia, c. 620/10–564/53 BC

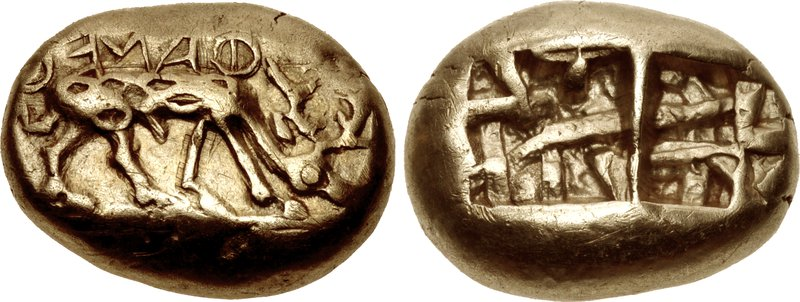
The earliest inscribed coinage: electrum coin of Phanes from Ephesus, 625–600 BC. Obverse: Stag grazing right, ΦΑΝΕΩΣ (retrograde). Reverse: Two incuse punches, each with raised intersecting lines.

The earliest coins are mostly associated with Iron Age Anatolia of the late 7th century BC, and especially with the kingdom of Lydia perhaps during the reign of Gyges, more certainly as electrum coins minted for king Alyattes of Lydia (died c. 560 BC).

Early electrum coins (an alluvial alloy of gold and silver, varying wildly in proportion, and usually about 40–55% gold) were not standardized in weight, and in their earliest stage may have been ritual objects, such as badges or medals, issued by priests. The unpredictability of the composition of naturally occurring electrum implied that it had a variable value, which greatly hampered its development.

Most of the early Lydian coins include no writing ("legend" or "inscription"), only an image of a symbolic animal. Therefore, the dating of these coins relies primarily on archaeological evidence, with the most commonly cited evidence coming from excavations of the foundation deposit at the Temple of Artemis at Ephesus, also called the Ephesian Artemision (which would later evolve into one of the Seven Wonders of the Ancient World). This was the site of the earliest known deposit of electrum coins inscribed as Phanes, dated to 625–600 BC from Ephesus in Ionia, with the legend ΦΑΕΝΟΣ ΕΜΙ ΣHΜΑ (or similar) ("I am the badge/sign/mark of Phanes/light") or just bearing the name ΦΑΝΕΟΣ ("of Phanes"). Anatolian Artemis was the Πότνια Θηρῶν (Potnia Thêrôn, "Mistress of Animals"), whose symbol was the stag. It took some time before ancient coins were used for commerce and trade. Even the smallest-denomination electrum coins, perhaps worth about a day's subsistence, would have been too valuable for buying a loaf of bread. Maybe the first coins to be used for retailing on a large-scale basis were likely small silver fractions, hemiobol, Ancient Greek coinage minted by the Ionian Greeks in the late sixth century BC.

In contrast Herodotus mentioned the innovation made by the Lydians:

So far as we have any knowledge, they [the Lydians] were the first people to introduce the use of gold and silver coins, and the first who sold goods by retail.

— Herodotus, I94

And both Aristotle (fr. 611,37, ed. V. Rose) and Pollux (Onamastikon IX.83), mention that the first issuer of coinage was Hermodike/Demodike of Cyme. Cyme was a city in Aeolia, nearby Lydia.

Another example of local pride is the dispute about coinage, whether the first one to strike it was Pheidon of Argos, or Demodike of Kyme (who was wife of Midas the Phrygian and daughter of King Agammemnon of Kyme), or Erichthonios and Lycos of Athens, or the Lydians (as Xenophanes says) or the Naxians (as Anglosthenes thought).

— Julius Pollux, Onamastikon IX.83

Many early Lydian and Greek coins were minted under the authority of private individuals and are thus more akin to tokens or badges than to modern coins, though due to their numbers it is evident that some were official state issues.

==== Bullion and unmarked metals (6th century BC) ====
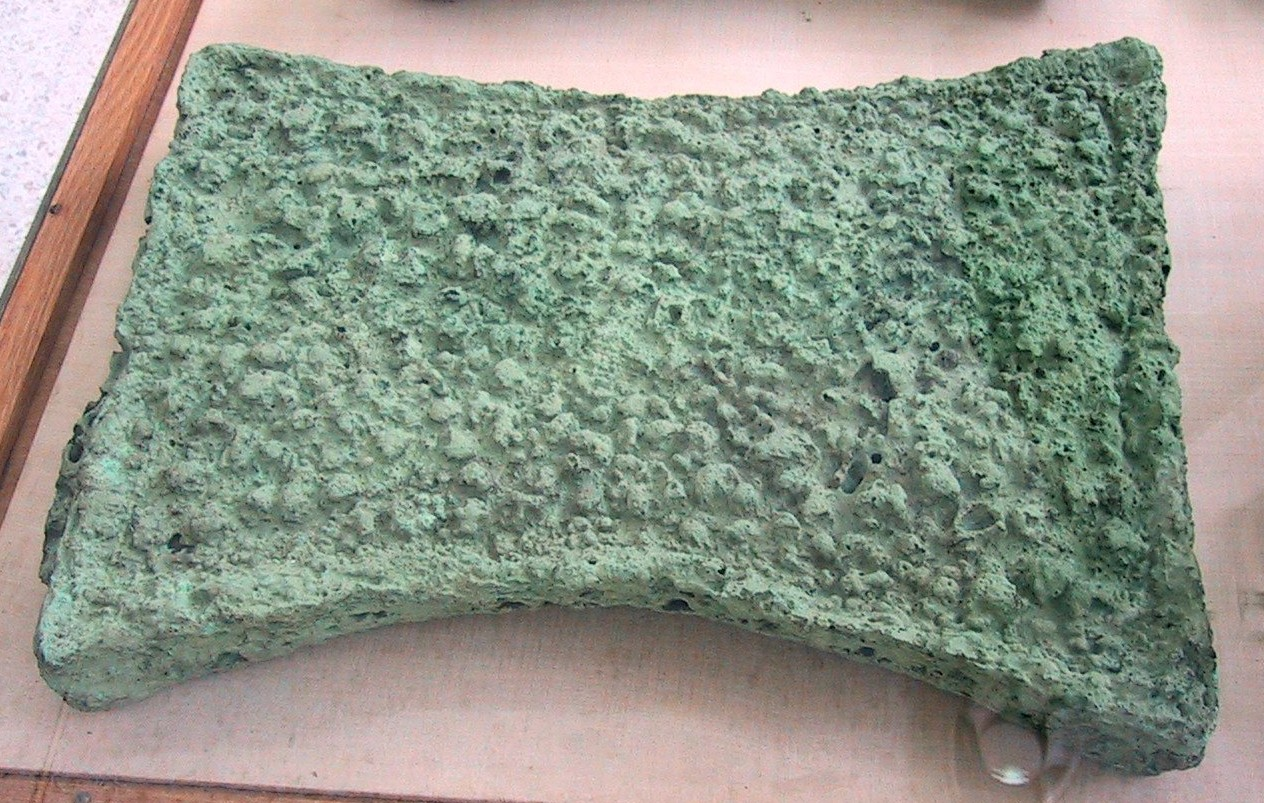
An oxhide ingot from Crete. Late Bronze Age metal ingots were given standard shapes, such as the shape of an "ox-hide", suggesting that they represented standardized values.

Metal ingots, silver bullion or unmarked bars were probably in use for exchange among many of the civilizations that mastered metallurgy. The weight and purity of bullion would be the key determinant of value. In the Achaemenid Empire in the early 6th century BC, coinage was yet unknown. The barter system, as well as silver bullion were used instead for trade. The practice of using silver bars for currency also seems to have been current in Central Asia from the 6th century BC. Coins were an evolution of "currency" systems of the Late Bronze Age, when various cultures used standard-sized ingots and tokens such as knife money to store and transfer value. Phoenician metal ingots had to be stamped with the name of a current ruler to guarantee their worth and value, which is probably how stamping busts and designs began, although political advertising – glorification of a state or of a ruler – may also play a role.

==== Croesus: Pure gold and silver coins (c. 560–546 BC) ====
Croeseids

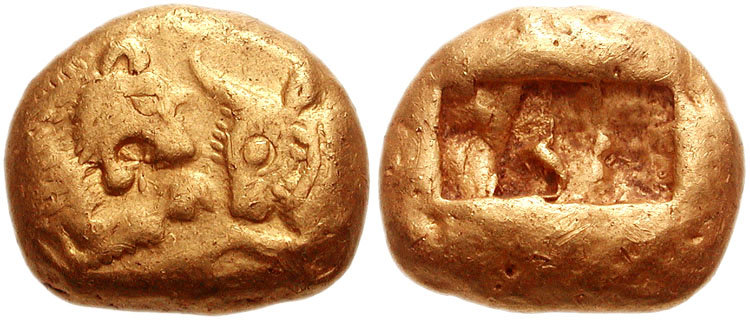
Gold Croeseid, minted by King Croesus, c. 561–546 BC. (10.7 grams, Sardis mint)

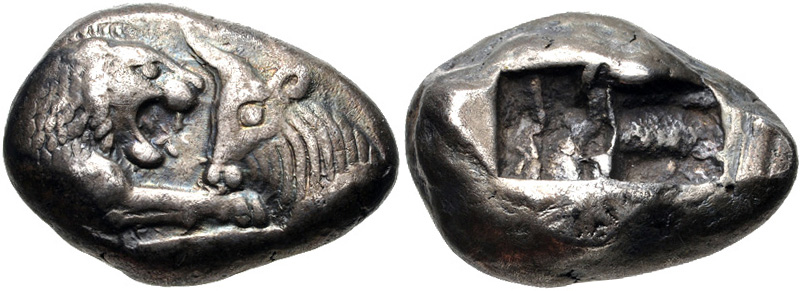
Silver Croeseid, minted by King Croesus, c. 560–546 BC (10.7 grams, Sardis mint)

The gold and silver Croeseids formed the world's first bimetallic monetary system, c. 550 BC.

The successor of Alyattes, king Croesus (r. c. 560–546 BC), became associated with great wealth in Greek historiography. He is credited with issuing the Croeseid, the first true gold coins with a standardized purity for general circulation. and the world's first bimetallic monetary system c. 550 BC.

Coins spread rapidly in the 6th and 5th centuries BC, leading to the development of Ancient Greek coinage and Achaemenid coinage, and further to Illyrian coinage.

==== Achaemenid coinage (546–330 BC) ====
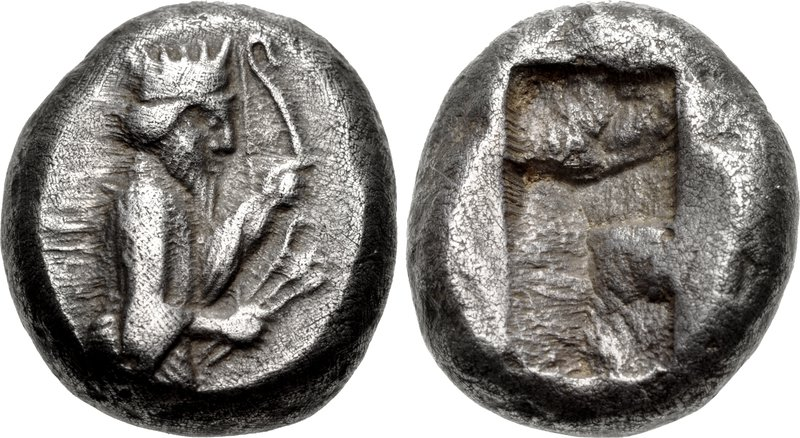
The first type of Siglos (Type I: "King with bow and arrows", upper body of the king only), from the time of Darius I, c. 520–505 BC

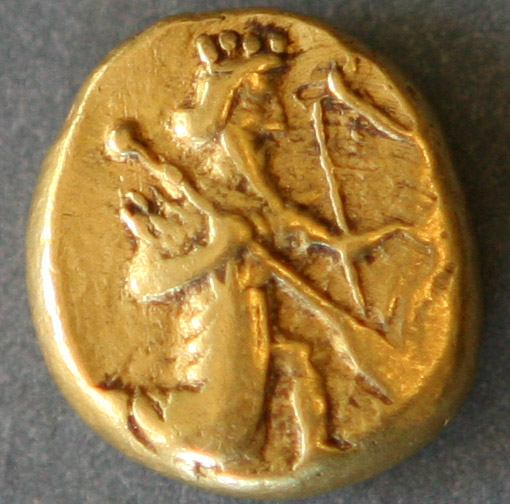
Daric gold coin, c. 490 BC; one of the most successful of Antiquity.

When Cyrus the Great (550–530 BC) came to power, coinage was unfamiliar in his realm. Barter and to some extent silver bullion was used instead for trade. The practice of using silver bars for currency also seems to have been current in Central Asia from the 6th century.

Cyrus the Great introduced coins to the Persian Empire after 546 BC, following his conquest of Lydia and the defeat of its king Croesus, who had put in place the first coinage in history. With his conquest of Lydia, Cyrus acquired a region in which coinage was invented, developed through advanced metallurgy, and had already been in circulation for about 50 years, making the Lydian Kingdom one of the leading trade powers of the time. It seems Cyrus initially adopted the Lydian coinage as such, and continued to strike Lydia's lion-and-bull coinage.

Original coins of the Achaemenid Empire were issued from 520 BC – 450 BC to 330 BC. The Persian daric was the first truly Achaemenid gold coin which, along with a similar silver coin, the Siglos, represented the bimetallic monetary standard of the Achaemenid Persian Empire.

===== Coinage of Southern Asia under the Achaemenid Empire =====
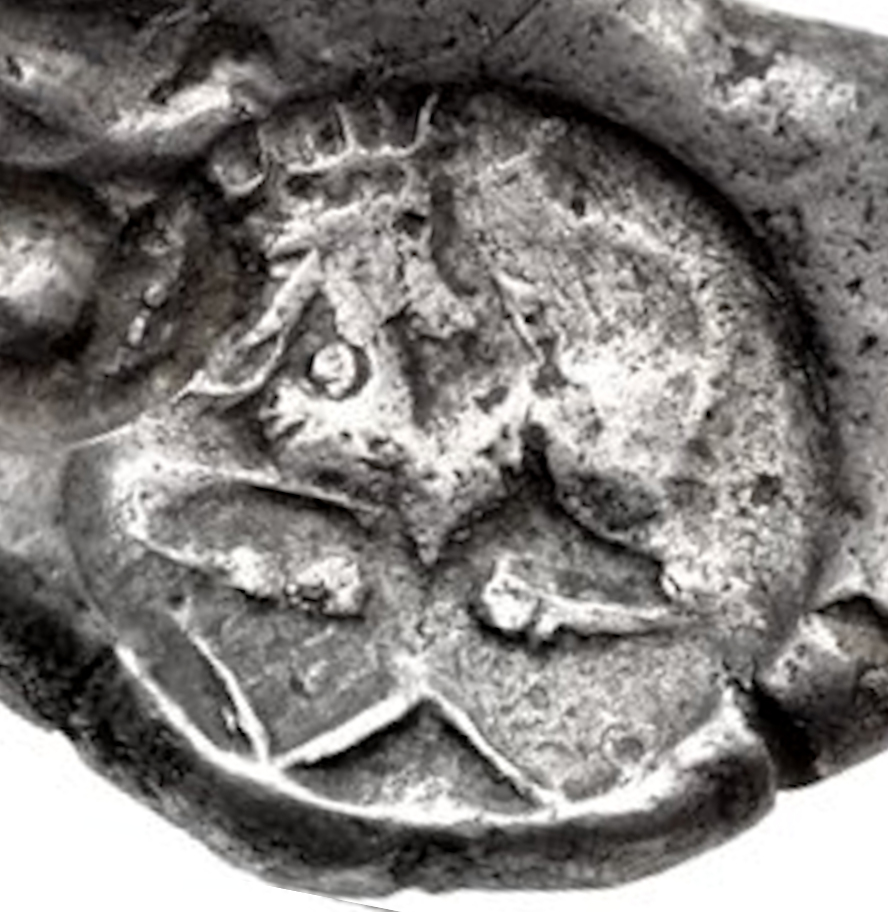
A siglos found in the Kabul valley, 5th century BC. Coins of this type were also found in the Bhir Mound hoard.

The Achaemenid Empire already reached the doors of India during the original expansion of Cyrus the Great, and the Achaemenid conquest of the Indus Valley is dated to c. 515 BC under Darius I. An Achaemenid administration was established in the area. The Kabul hoard, also called the Chaman Hazouri hoard, is a coin hoard discovered in the vicinity of Kabul, Afghanistan, containing numerous Achaemenid coins as well as many Greek coins from the 5th and 4th centuries BC. The deposit of the hoard is dated to the Achaemenid period, in approximately 380 BC. The hoard also contained many locally produced silver coins, minted by local authorities under Achaemenid rule. Several of these issues follow the "western designs" of the facing bull heads, a stag, or Persian column capitals on the obverse, and incuse punch on the reverse.

According to numismatist Joe Cribb, these finds suggest that the idea of coinage and the use of punch-marked techniques was introduced to India from the Achaemenid Empire during the 4th century BC. More Achaemenid coins were also found in Pushkalavati and in Bhir Mound.

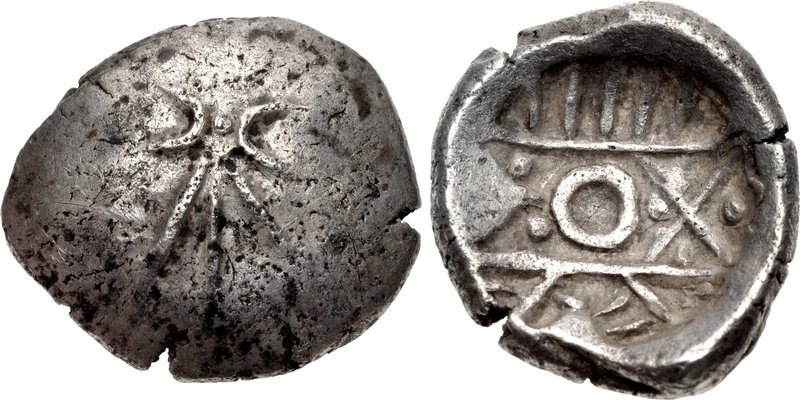
Punch-marked coin minted in the Kabul Valley under Achaemenid administration, c. 500–380 BC, or c. 350 BC.

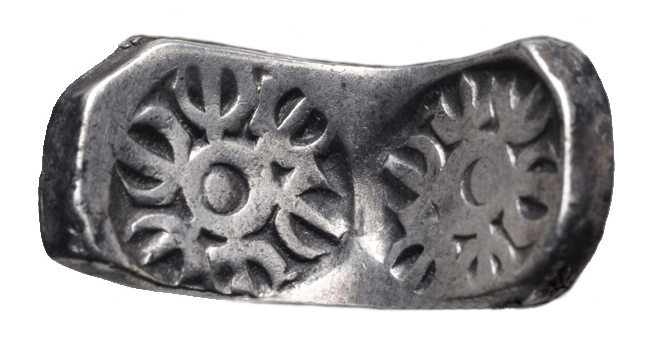
Gandharan "bent-bar" punch-marked coin minted under Achaemenid administration, of the type found in large quantities in the Chaman Hazouri and the Bhir Mound hoards.

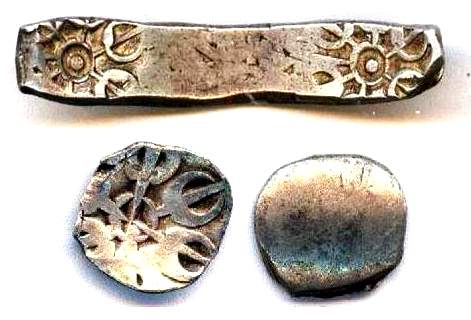
Early punch-marked coins of Gandhara, Taxila-Gandhara region.

==== Greek Archaic coinage (until about 480 BC) ====
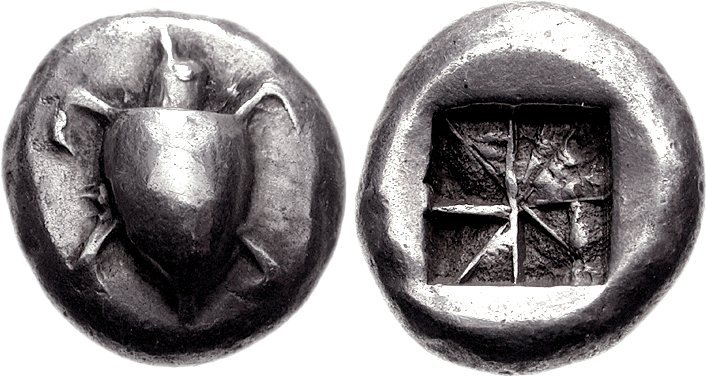
Silver stater of Aegina, 550–530 BC. Obverse: sea turtle with large pellets down centre. Reverse: incuse square punch with eight sections.

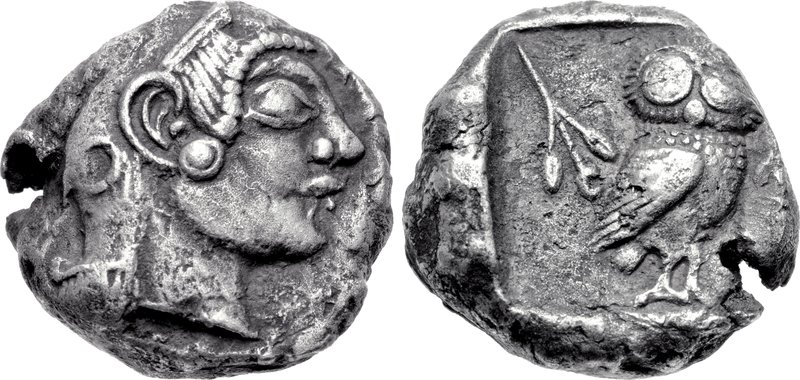
Athenian coin (c. 500/490–485 BC) discovered in the Shaikhan Dehri hoard in Pushkalavati, Pakistan. This coin is the earliest known example of its type to be found so far east.

According to Aristotle (fr. 611,37, ed. V. Rose) and Pollux (Onamastikon IX.83), the first issuer of Greek coinage was Hermodike of Kyme.

A small percentage of early Lydian/Greek coins have a legend. The most ancient inscribed coin known is from nearby Caria. This coin has a Greek legend reading phaenos emi sema interpreted variously as "I am the badge of Phanes", or "I am the sign of light". The Phanes coins are among the earliest of Greek coins; a hemihekte of the issue was found in the foundation deposit of the temple of Artemis at Ephesos (the oldest deposit of electrum coins discovered). One assumption is that Phanes was a mercenary mentioned by Herodotus, another that this coin is associated with the primeval god Phanes or "Phanes" might have been an epithet of the local goddess identified with Artemis. Barclay V. Head found these suggestions unlikely and thought it more probably "the name of some prominent citizen of Ephesus".

Another candidate for the site of the earliest coins is Aegina, where Chelone ("turtle") coins were first minted c. 700 BC. Coins from Athens and Corinth appeared shortly thereafter, known to exist at least since the late 6th century BC.

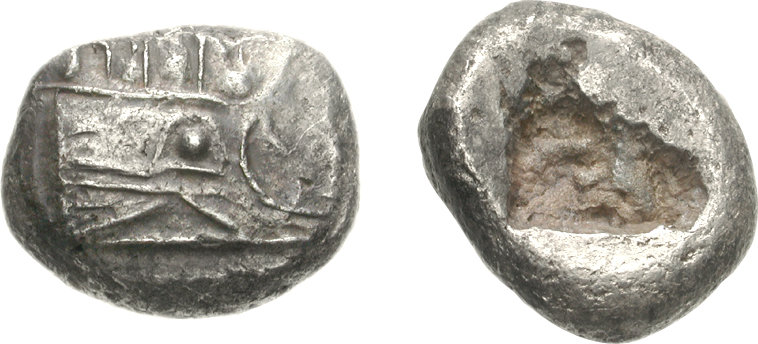
Coin of Phaselis, Lycia, c. 550–530/20 BC.

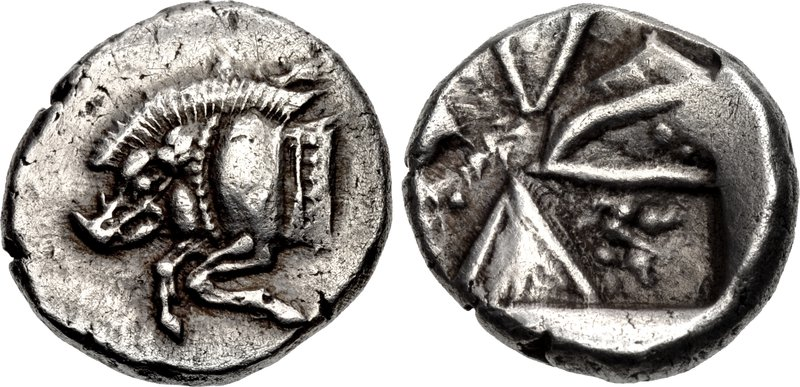
Coin of Lycia, c. 520–470/60 BC.

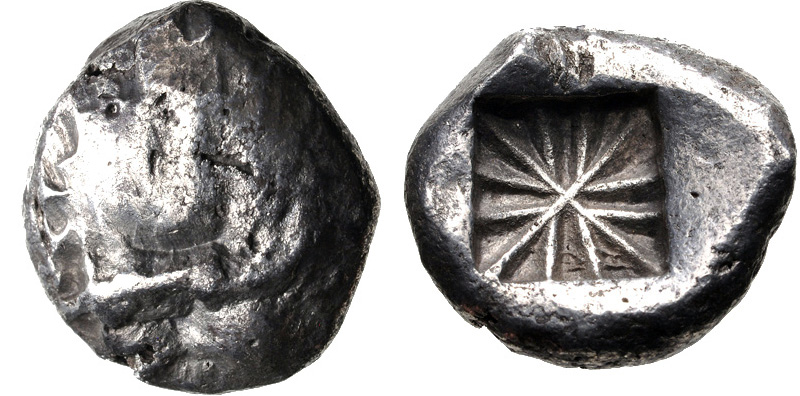
Lycia coin, c. 520-470 BC. Struck with worn obverse die.

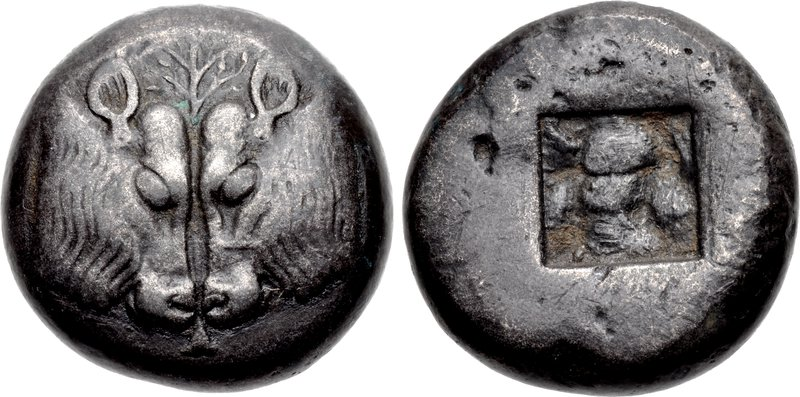
Coin of Lesbos, Ionia, c. 510–80 BC.

=== Antiquity ===
==== Classical Greek antiquity (480 BC~) ====
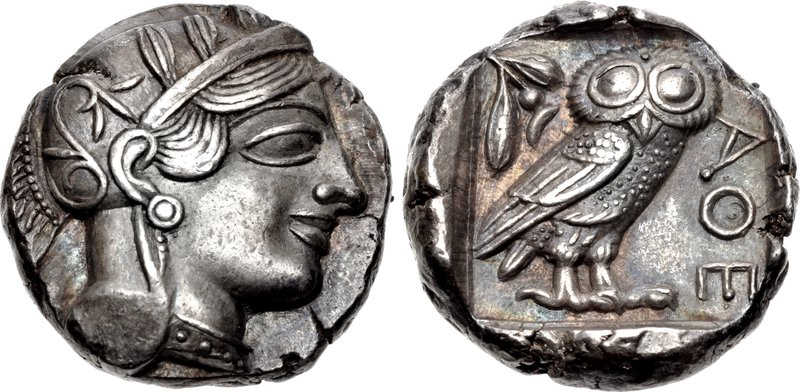
Tetradrachm of Athens
(c. 454–404 BC)
Obverse: a portrait of Athena, patron goddess of the city, in helmet
Reverse: the owl of Athens, with an olive sprig and the inscription "ΑΘΕ", short for ΑΘΕΝΑΙΟΝ, "of the Athenians"

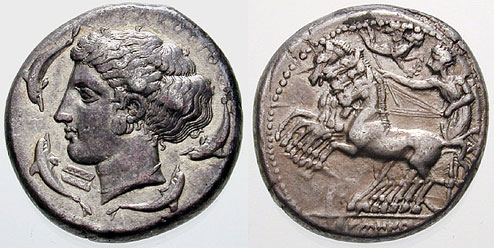
A Syracusan tetradrachm
(c. 415–405 BC)
Obverse: head of the nymph Arethusa, surrounded by four swimming dolphins and a rudder
Reverse: a racing quadriga, its charioteer crowned by the goddess Victory in flight.

The Classical period saw Greek coinage reach a high level of technical and aesthetic quality. Larger cities now produced a range of fine silver and gold coins, most bearing a portrait of their patron god or goddess or a legendary hero on one side, and a symbol of the city on the other. Some coins employed a visual pun: some coins from Rhodes featured a rose, since the Greek word for rose is rhodon. The use of inscriptions on coins also began, usually the name of the issuing city.

The wealthy cities of Sicily produced some especially fine coins. The large silver decadrachmes (10-drachmes) coin from Syracuse is regarded by many collectors as the finest coin produced in the ancient world, perhaps ever. Syracusan issues were rather standard in their imprints, one side bearing the head of the nymph Arethusa and the other usually a victorious quadriga. The tyrants of Syracuse were fabulously rich, and part of their public relations policy was to fund quadrigas for the Olympic chariot race, a very expensive undertaking. As they were often able to finance more than one quadriga at a time, they were frequent victors in this highly prestigious event. Syracuse was one of the epicenters of numismatic art during the classical period. Led by the engravers Kimon and Euainetos, Syracuse produced some of the finest coin designs of antiquity.

Amongst the first centers to produce coins during the Greek colonization of Southern Italy (the so-called "Magna Graecia") were Paestum, Crotone, Sybaris, Caulonia, Metapontum, and Taranto. These ancient cities started producing coins from 550 BC to 510 BC.

Amisano, in a general publication, including the Etruscan coinage, attributing it the beginning to c. 560 BC in Populonia, a chronology that would leave out the contribution of the Greeks of Magna Graecia and attribute to the Etruscans the burden of introducing the coin in Italy. In this work, constant reference is made to classical sources, and credit is given to the origin of the Etruscan Lydia, a source supported by Herodotus, and also to the invention of coin in Lydia.

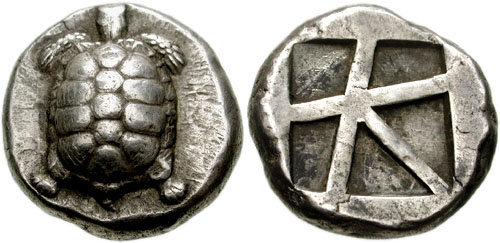
Aegina coin type, incuse skew pattern, c. 456/45–431 BC

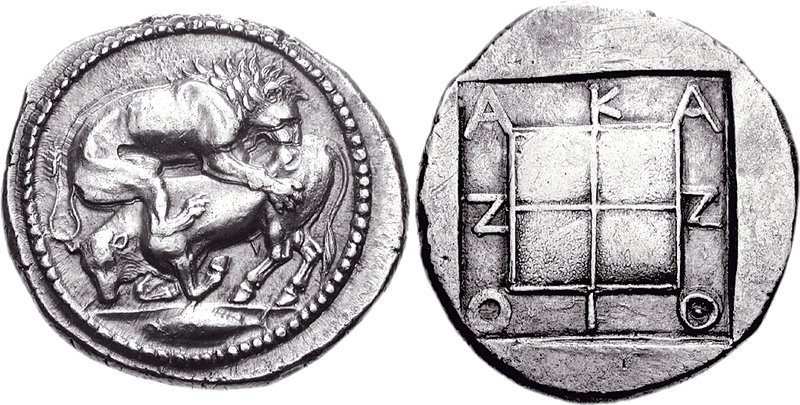
Coin of Akanthos, Macedon, c. 470-430 BC.

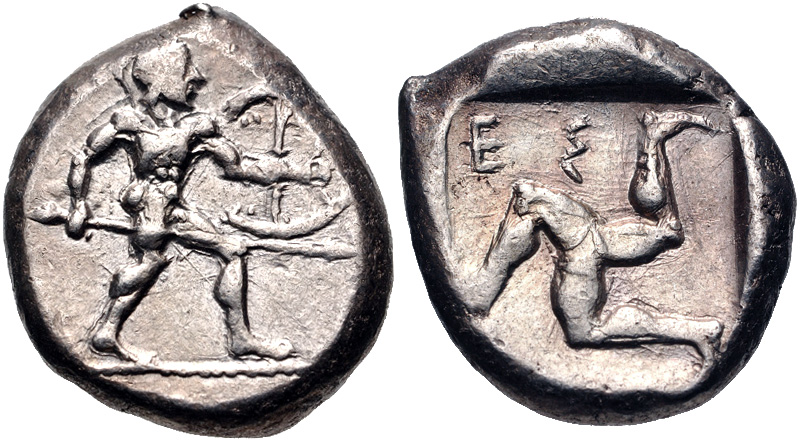
Coin of Aspendos, Pamphylia, c. 465–430 BC.

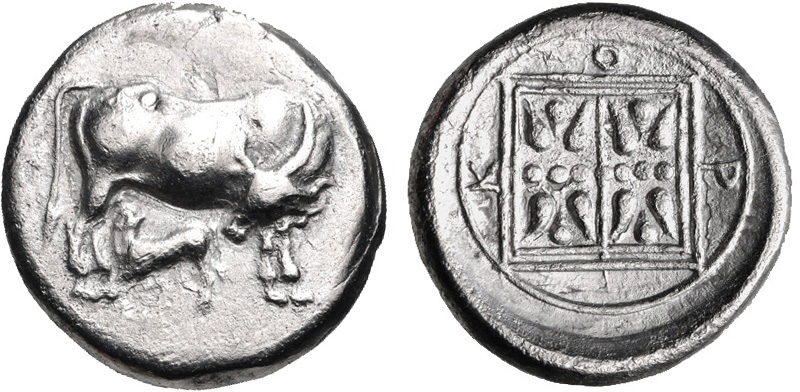
Coin from Korkyra, c. 350/30–290/70 BC.

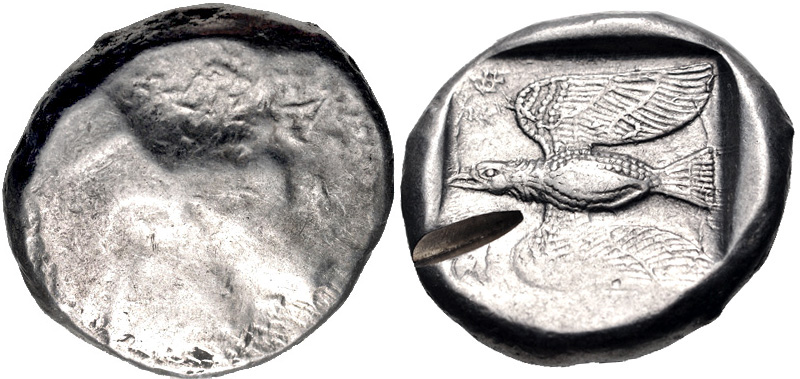
Coin of Cyprus, c. 450 BC.

==== Appearance of dynastic portraiture (5th century BC) ====
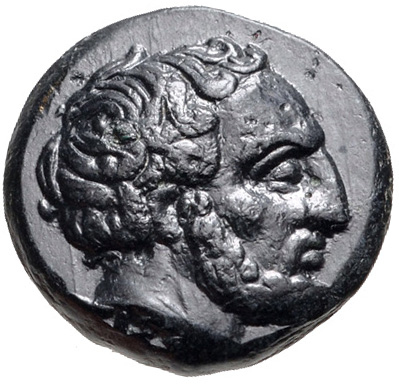
The Achaemenid Empire satraps and dynasts in Asia Minor developed the usage of portraiture from c. 420 BC. Portrait of the satrap of Lydia, Tissaphernes (c. 445–395 BC).

Although many of the first coins illustrated the images of various gods, the first portraiture of actual rulers appears with the coinage of Lycia in the 5th century BC. No ruler had dared illustrating his own portrait on coinage until that time. The Achaemenids had been the first to illustrate the person of their king or a hero in a stereotypical manner, showing a bust or the full body but never an actual portrait, on their Sigloi and Daric coinage from c. 500 BC. A slightly earlier candidate for the first portrait-coin is Themistocles the Athenian general, who became a Governor of Magnesia on the Meander, c. 465–459 BC, for the Achaemenid Empire, although there is some question as to whether his coins may have represented Zeus rather than himself. Themistocles may have been in a unique position in which he could transfer the notion of individual portraiture, already current in the Greek world, and at the same time wield the dynastic power of an Achaemenid dynasty who could issue his own coins and illustrate them as he wished. From the time of Alexander the Great, portraiture of the issuing ruler would then become a standard, generalized, feature of coinage.

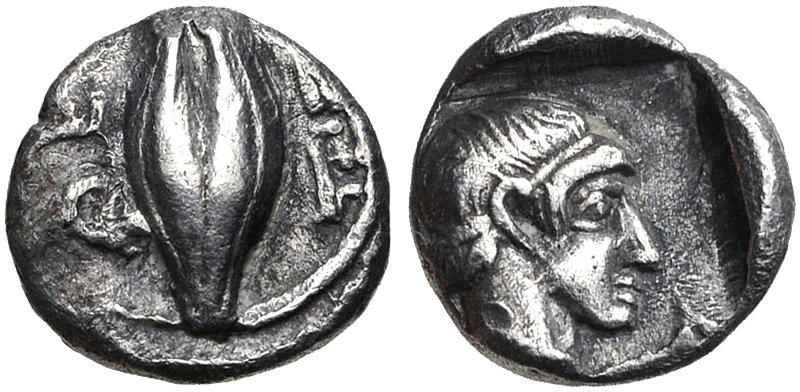
Coin of Themistocles as Governor of Magnesia. Obv: Barley grain. Rev: Possible portrait of Themistocles, c. 465–459 BC.

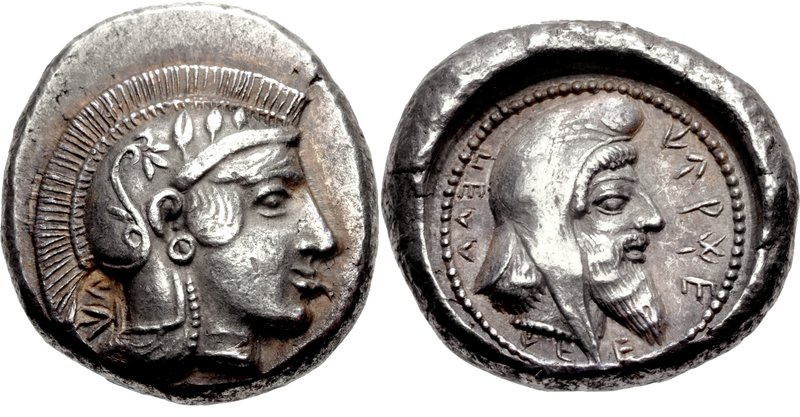
Portrait of Lycian ruler Kherei wearing the Persian cap on the reverse of his coins (ruled 410–390 BC).

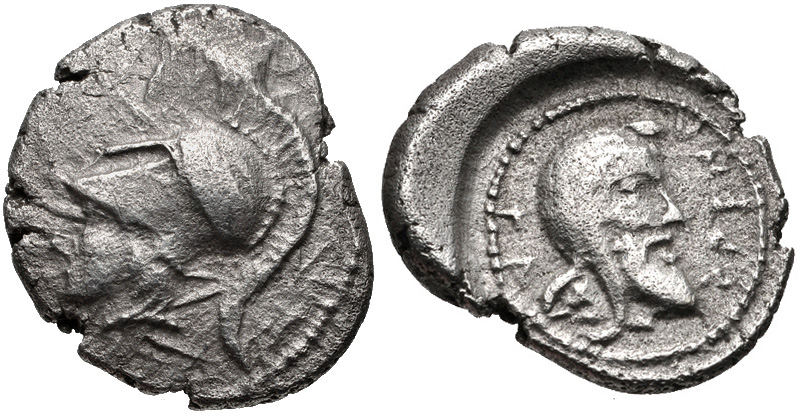
Portrait of Lycian ruler Erbbina wearing the Persian cap on the reverse of his coins (ruled 390–380 BC).

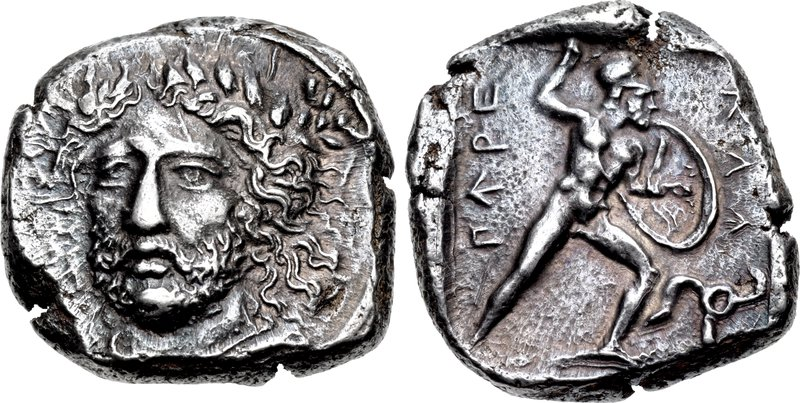
Portrait of Lycian ruler Perikles facing (ruled 380–360 BC).

==== Indian coins (c. 400 BC – AD 100) ====
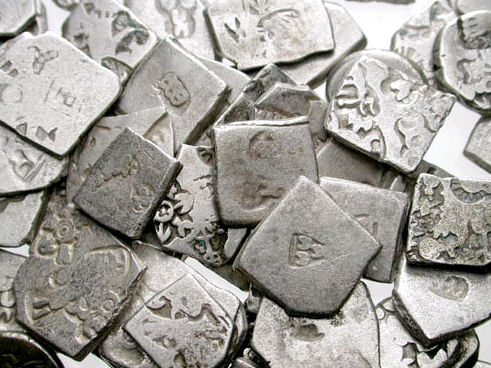
Hoard of mostly Mauryan Empire coins, 3rd century BC

The Karshapana is the earliest punch-marked coin found in India, produced from at least the mid-4th century BC, and possibly as early as 575 BC, influenced by similar coins produced in Gandhara under the Achaemenid empire, such as those of the Kabul hoard or other examples found at Pushkalavati and in Bhir Mound.

==== Chinese round coins (350 BC~) ====
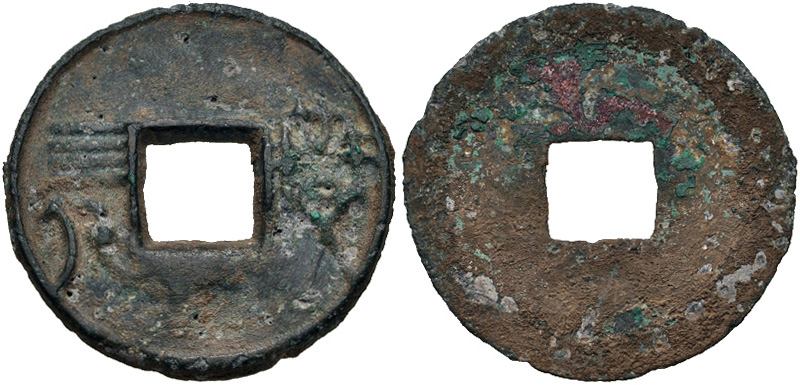
Chinese round coins, Eastern Zhou dynasty – Warring States Period, c. 300–220 BC. Four Hua (四化, 30mm, 6.94 g). Legend Yi Si Hua ([City of] Yi Four Hua).

In China, early round coins appeared in the 4th century BC and were adopted for all China by Emperor Qin Shi Huang Di at the end of 3rd century BC. The round coin, the precursor of the familiar cash coin, circulated in both the spade and knife money areas in the Zhou period, from around 350 BC. Apart from two small and presumably late coins from the State of Qin, coins from the spade money area have a round hole and refer to the jin and liang units. Those from the knife money area have a square hole and are denominated in hua (化).

Although for discussion purposes the Zhou coins are divided up into categories of knives, spades, and round coins, it is apparent from archaeological finds that most of the various kinds circulated together. A hoard found in 1981, near Hebi in north Henan province, consisted of: 3,537 Gong spades, 3 Anyi arched foot spades, 8 Liang Dang Lie spades, 18 Liang square foot spades and 1,180 Yuan round coins, all contained in three clay jars.

==== Hellenistic period (320 BC – AD 30) ====
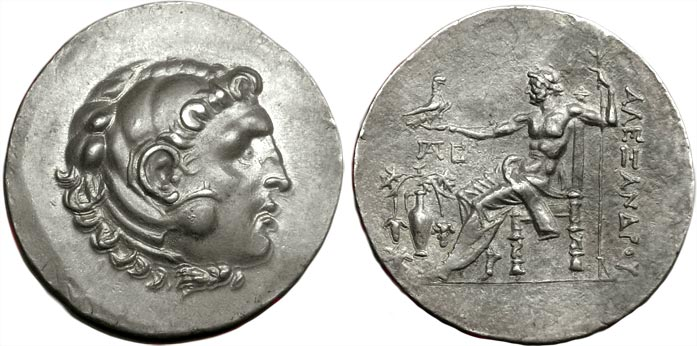
Posthumous Alexander the Great tetradrachm from Temnos, Aeolis. Dated 188–170 BC. Obverse: Alexander the Great as Herakles facing right wearing the nemean lionskin. Reverse: Zeus seated on throne to the left holding eagle in right hand and scepter in left; in left field PA monogram and angular sigma above grape vine arching over oinochoe; ALEXANDROU vertical in right field. Reference: Price 1678.

The Hellenistic period was characterized by the spread of Greek culture across a large part of the known world. Greek-speaking kingdoms were established in Egypt and Syria, and for a time also in Iran and as far east as what is now Afghanistan and northwestern India. Greek traders spread Greek coins across this vast area, and the new kingdoms soon began to produce their own coins. Because these kingdoms were much larger and wealthier than the Greek city states of the classical period, their coins tended to be more mass-produced, as well as larger, and more frequently in gold. They often lacked the aesthetic delicacy of coins of the earlier period.

Still, some of the Greco-Bactrian coins, and those of their successors in India, the Indo-Greeks, are considered the finest examples of Greek numismatic art with "a nice blend of realism and idealization", including the largest coins to be minted in the Hellenistic world: the largest gold coin was minted by Eucratides (reigned 171–145 BC), the largest silver coin by the Indo-Greek king Amyntas Nikator (reigned c. 95–90 BC). The portraits "show a degree of individuality never matched by the often bland depictions of their royal contemporaries further West" (Roger Ling, "Greece and the Hellenistic World").

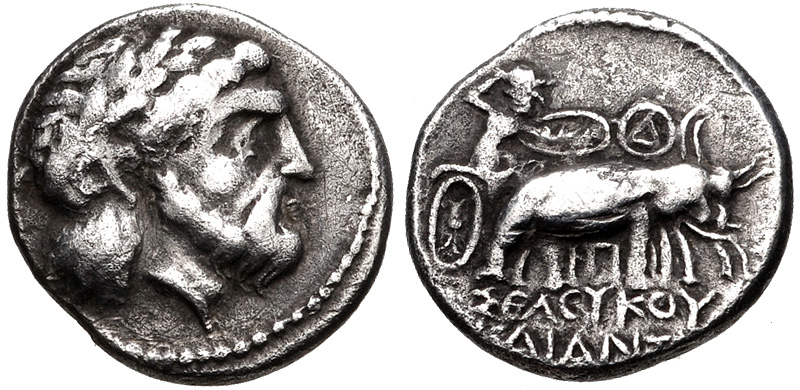
Seleucus Nicator (312–281 BC), Ai Khanoum

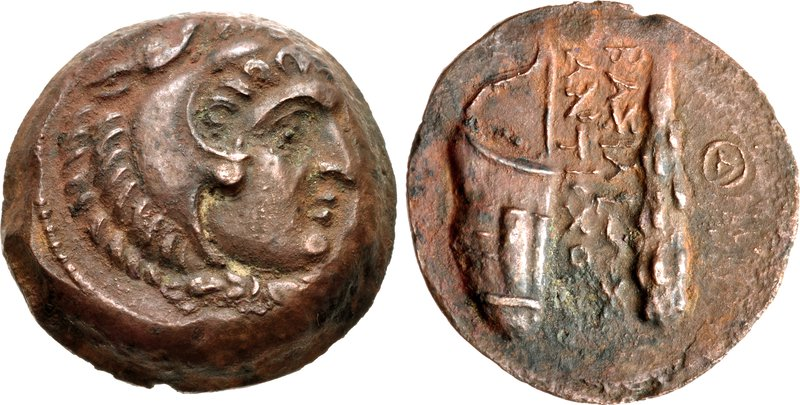
Antiochus I (281–261 BC), Ai Khanoum

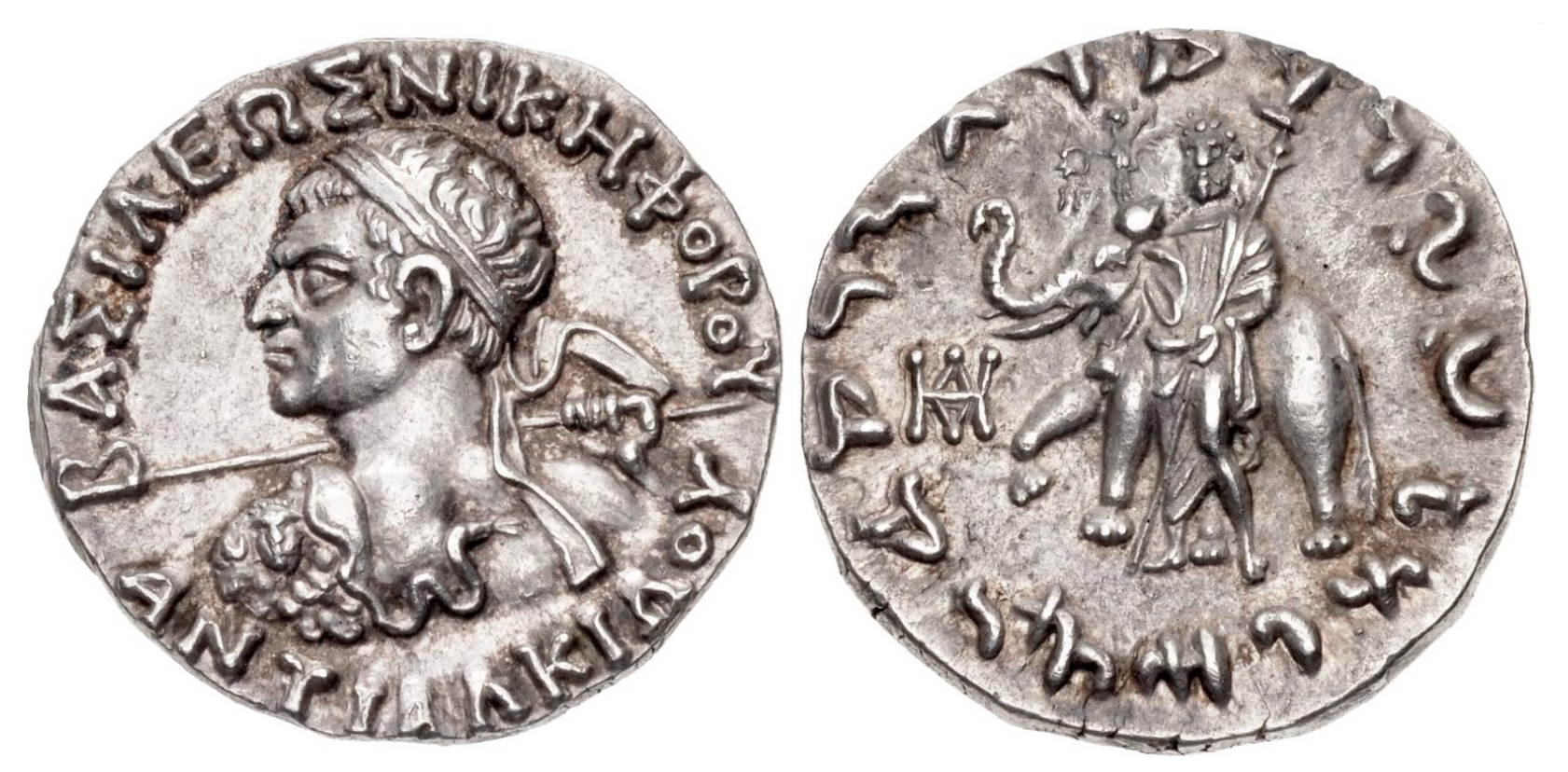
Bilingual coin of Indo-Greek king Antialcidas (105–95 BC)

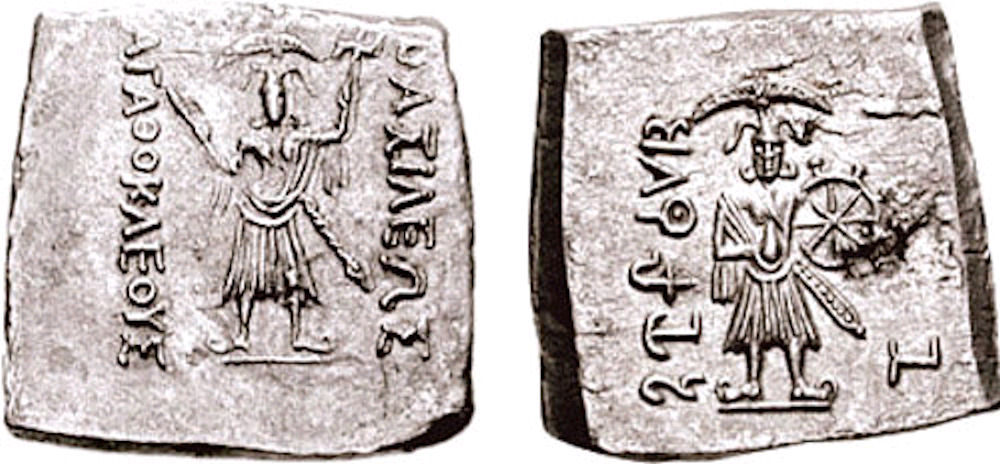
Bilingual coin of Agathocles of Bactria with Hindu deities, c. 180 BC

==== Roman period (290 BC~) ====
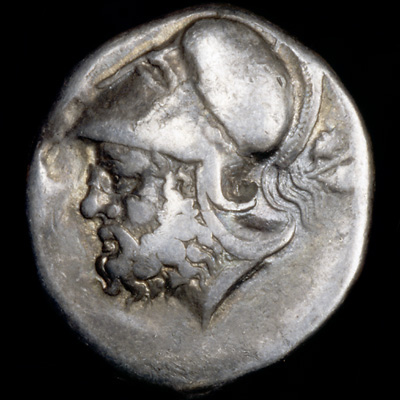
O: Bearded head of Mars with Corinthian helmet left.

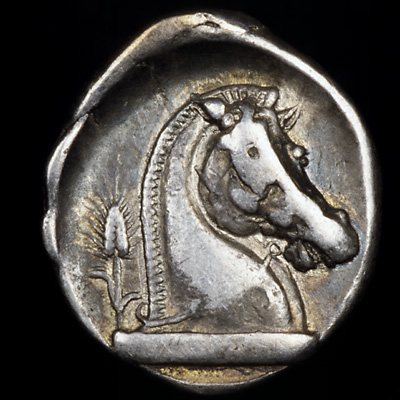
R: Horse head right, grain ear behind.

The first Roman silver coin, 281 BC. Crawford 13/1

Coinage followed Greek colonization and influence first around the Mediterranean and soon after to North Africa (including Egypt), Syria, Persia, and the Balkans. Coins came late to the Roman Republic compared with the rest of the Mediterranean, especially Greece and Asia Minor where coins were invented in the 7th century BC. The currency of central Italy was influenced by its natural resources, with bronze being abundant (the Etruscans were famous metal workers in bronze and iron) and silver ore being scarce. The coinage of the Roman Republic started with a few silver coins apparently devised for trade with Celtic in northern Italy and the Greek colonies in Southern Italy, and heavy cast bronze pieces for use in Central Italy. The first Roman coins, which were crude, heavy cast bronzes, were issued c. 289 BC. Amisano, in a general publication, including the Etruscan coinage, attributing it the beginning to about 550 BC in Populonia, a chronology that would leave out the contribution of the Greeks of Magna Graecia and attribute to the Etruscans the burden of introducing the coin in Italy. In this work, constant reference is made to classical sources, and credit is given to the origin of the Etruscan Lydia, a source supported by Herodotus, and also to the invention of coin in Lydia.

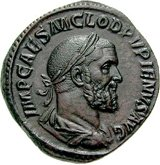
Sestertius of Marcus Clodius Pupienus Maximus, AD 238

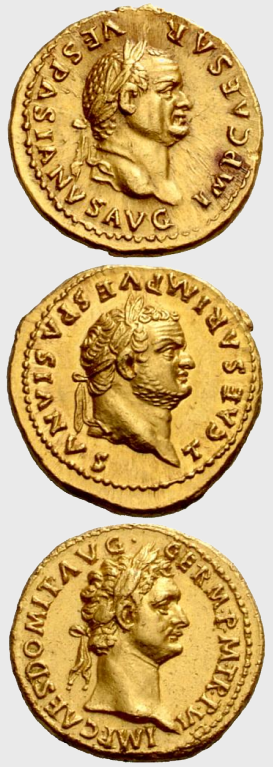
Set of three Roman aurei depicting the rulers of the Flavian dynasty. Top to bottom: Vespasian, Titus and Domitian, AD 69–96

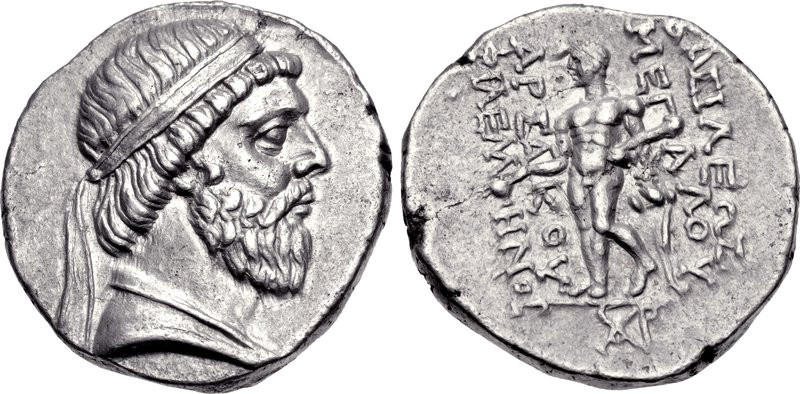
Silver Drachma of Mehrdad (Mithridates I) of Persian Empire of Parthia, 165 BC

=== Middle Ages ===
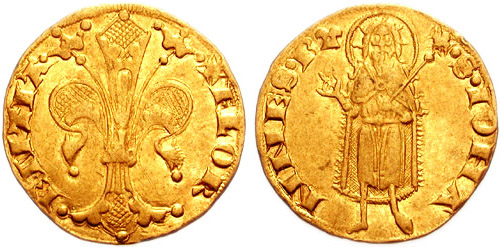
Florentine florin, 1347

Charlemagne, in 800 AD, implemented a series of reforms upon becoming "Holy Roman Emperor", including the issuance of a standard coin, the silver penny. Between 794 and 1200 the penny was the only denomination of coin in Western Europe. Minted without oversight by bishops, cities, feudal lords and fiefdoms, by 1160, coins in Venice contained only 0.05g of silver, while England's coins were minted at 1.3g. Large coins were introduced in the mid-13th century. In England, a dozen pennies was called a "shilling" and twenty shillings a "pound": consistent with e.g. France.

Debasement of coin was widespread. There were periods of significant debasement in 1340–60 and 1417–29, when no small coins were minted, and by the 15th century the issuance of small coin was further restricted by government restrictions and even prohibitions. With the exception of the Great Debasement, England's coins were consistently minted from sterling silver (silver content of 92.5%). A lower quality of silver with more copper mixed in, used in Barcelona, was called billon. The first European coin to use Arabic numerals to date the year in which the coin was minted was the St. Gall silver Plappart of 1424.

Italy has been influential at a coinage point of view: the Florentine florin, one of the most used coinage types in European history and one of the most important coins in Western history, was struck in Florence in the 13th century, while the Venetian sequin, minted from 1284 to 1797, was the most prestigious gold coin in circulation in the commercial centers of the Mediterranean Sea. The Florentine florin was the first European gold coin struck in sufficient quantities since the 7th century to play a significant commercial role. The Florentine florin was used for larger transactions such as those used in dowries, international trade or for tax-related matters.

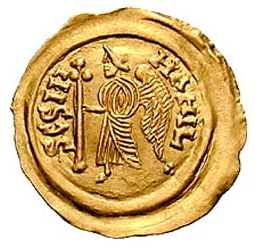
Lombardic Tremissis depicting Saint Michael, AD 688–700

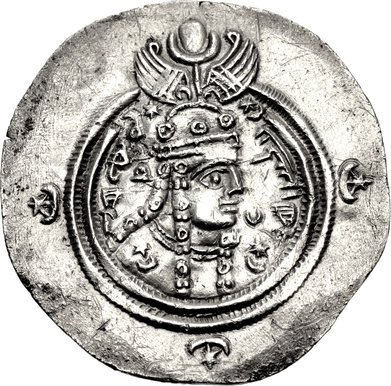
Silver coin of Borandukht of Persian Sassanian Empire, AD 629

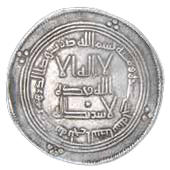
Silver Dirham of the Umayyad Caliphate, AD 729; minted by using Persian Sassanian framework

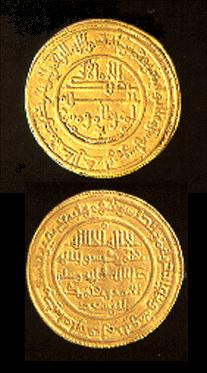
Abbasid coin, c. 1080s

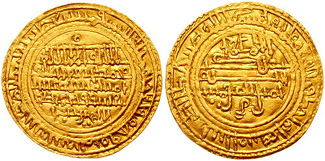
Almoravid coin, 1138–1139

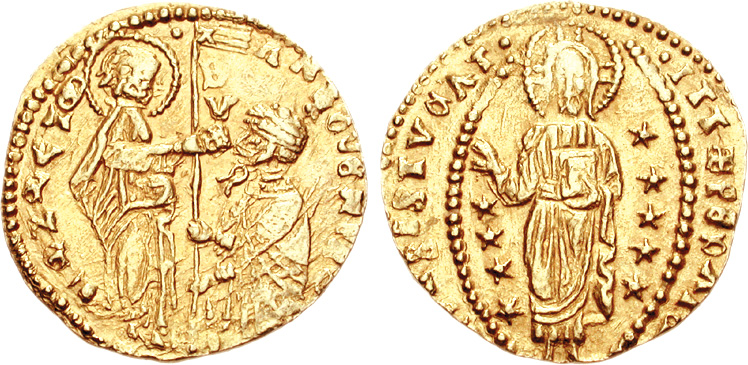
Venetian sequin, 1382

=== Modern history ===
Genoese coins became important in the 16th century during the Golden age of Genoese banking, with the Spanish Empire funnelling its massive wealth from Spanish America through the Bank of Saint George. With the decline in the fortunes of the Genoese banks and the Spanish Empire in the 17th century, however, the Genoese lira also depreciated substantially. The silver scudo's value increased to 6.5 lire in 1646, 7.4 lire in 1671, and 8.74 lire just before the Austrian occupation of Genoa in 1746.

Variations in the weight of precious metals used in international trade, particularly in imports of spices and textiles into Europe, explain the numerous monetary reforms that occurred in this period. The effect of these transactions on the available reserves of gold and silver was at the origin of the various monetary reforms, which changed the price of silver compared to gold. Faced with the distinct monetary systems developed by Genoa, Venice or Florence, the widespread use in the 15th century of the silver thaler, of constant size and weight, allowed conversion operations to be limited and therefore exchanges facilitated. The thaler was the monetary unit of the Germanic countries until the 19th century and is considered the ancestor of the United States dollar. At the same time, the Mexican Mint was established on May 11, 1535, by order of the Spanish king following the Spanish colonization of the Americas. Opened in April 1536, this mint had the right to mint silver Spanish real which became the basis of the monetary system of the Spanish Empire. Louis XIII had the Louis d'or minted in 1640 to compete with these coins.

The first attested siege coins appeared at the siege of Pavia in 1524. Auxiliary coins consisted, among the Greeks and Romans as in our modern societies, of coins strongly linked to copper. In particular, the red copper alloy was used for its physical properties, suitable for objects constantly subjected to manipulation: malleability, resistance to impacts, wear and corrosion (only gold has better resistance to corrosion). This alloy was often mixed with a little tin, zinc and especially nickel for their anti-corrosive, ductile and anti-fouling properties.

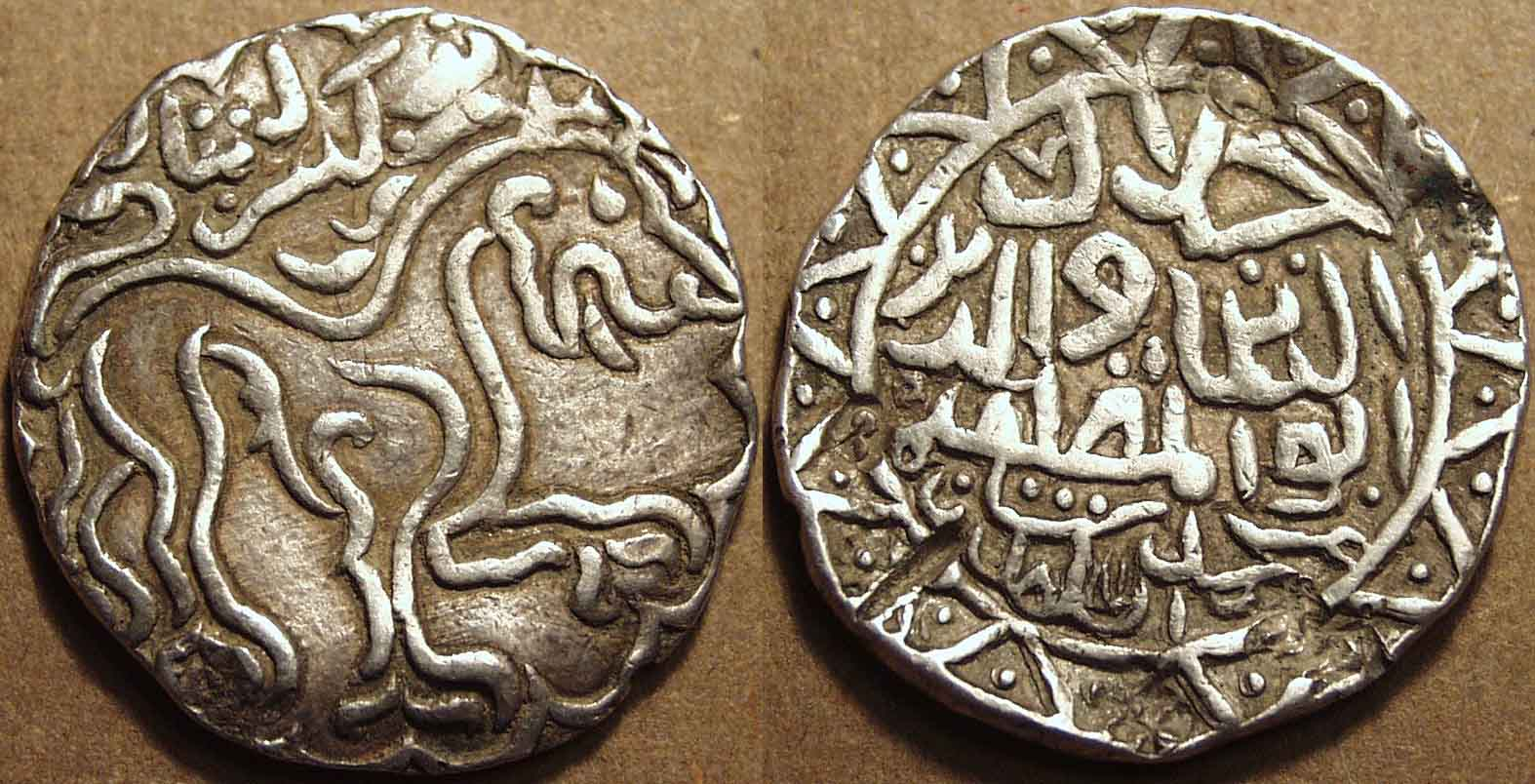
Silver coin of the 15th-century Bengal Sultanate ruler Jalaluddin Muhammad Shah

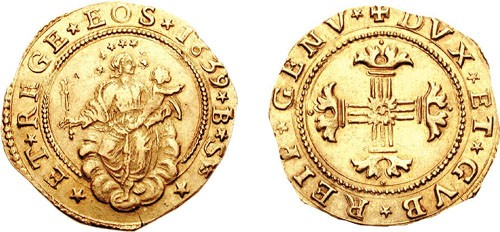
Genoese doppia, 1639

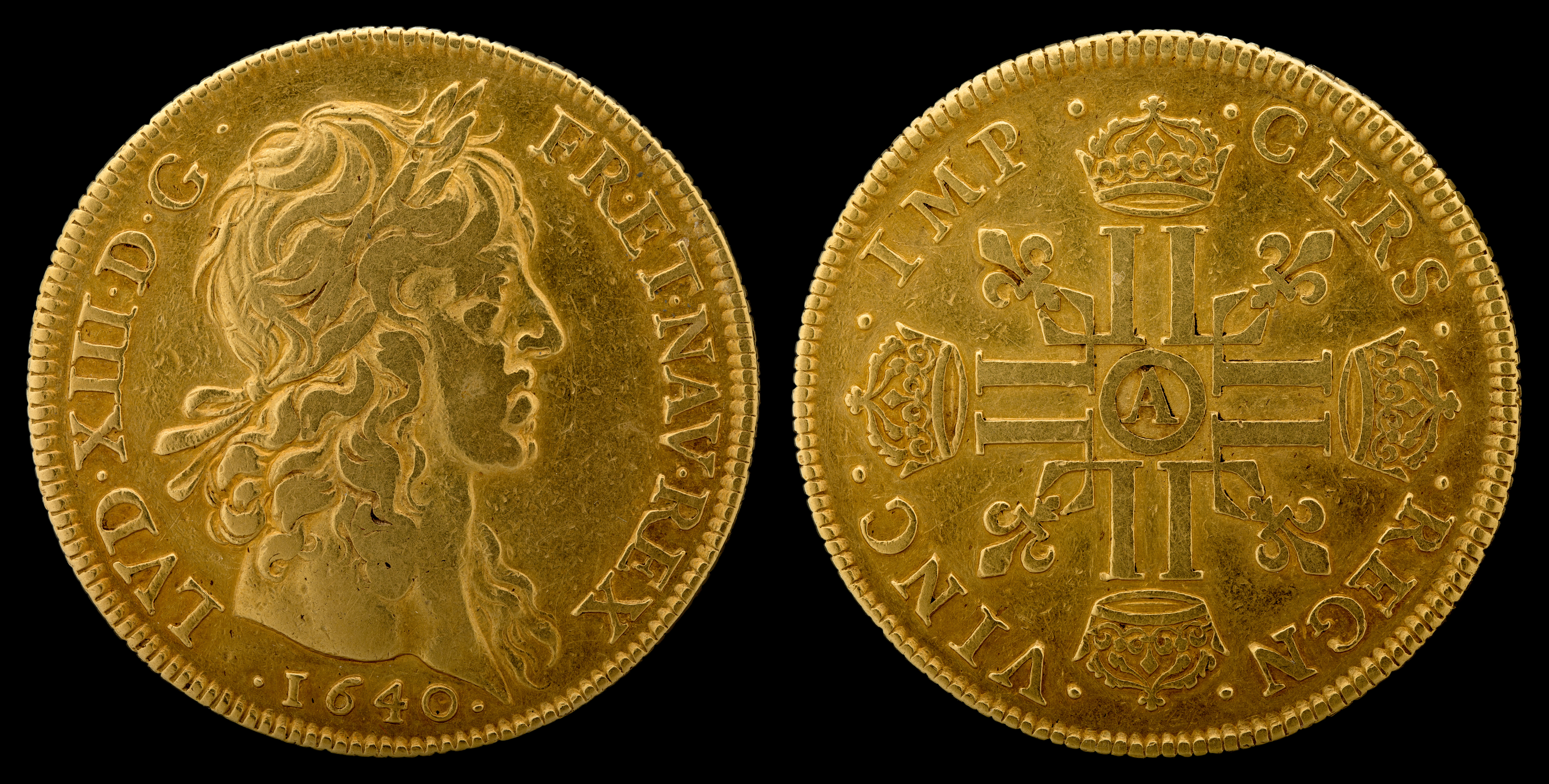
Louis d'or, 1640

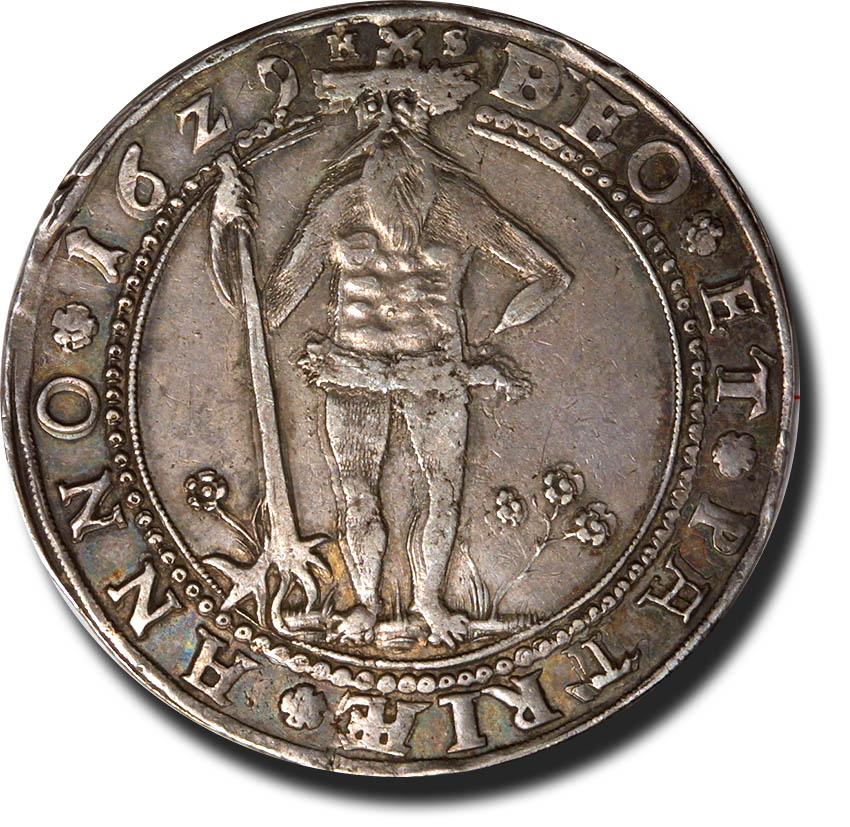
Brunswick-Wolfenbüttel Thaler minted in 1629

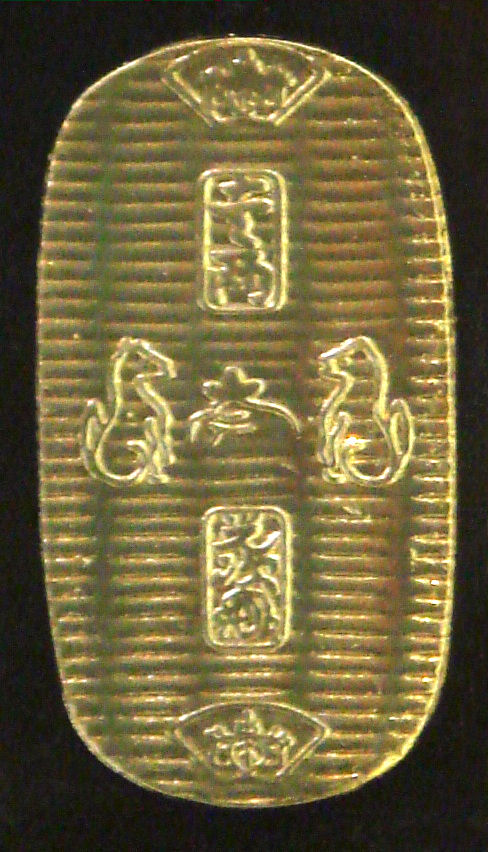
Japanese local currency Genbun Inari Koban Kin, c. 1736–1741

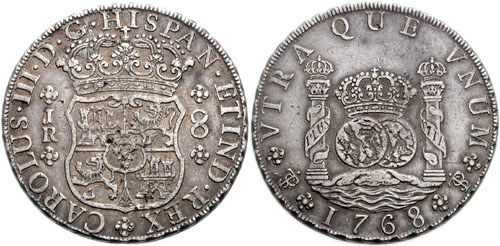
1768 silver Spanish Dollar, or eight reales coin (the "piece of eight" of pirate fame), minted throughout the Spanish Empire

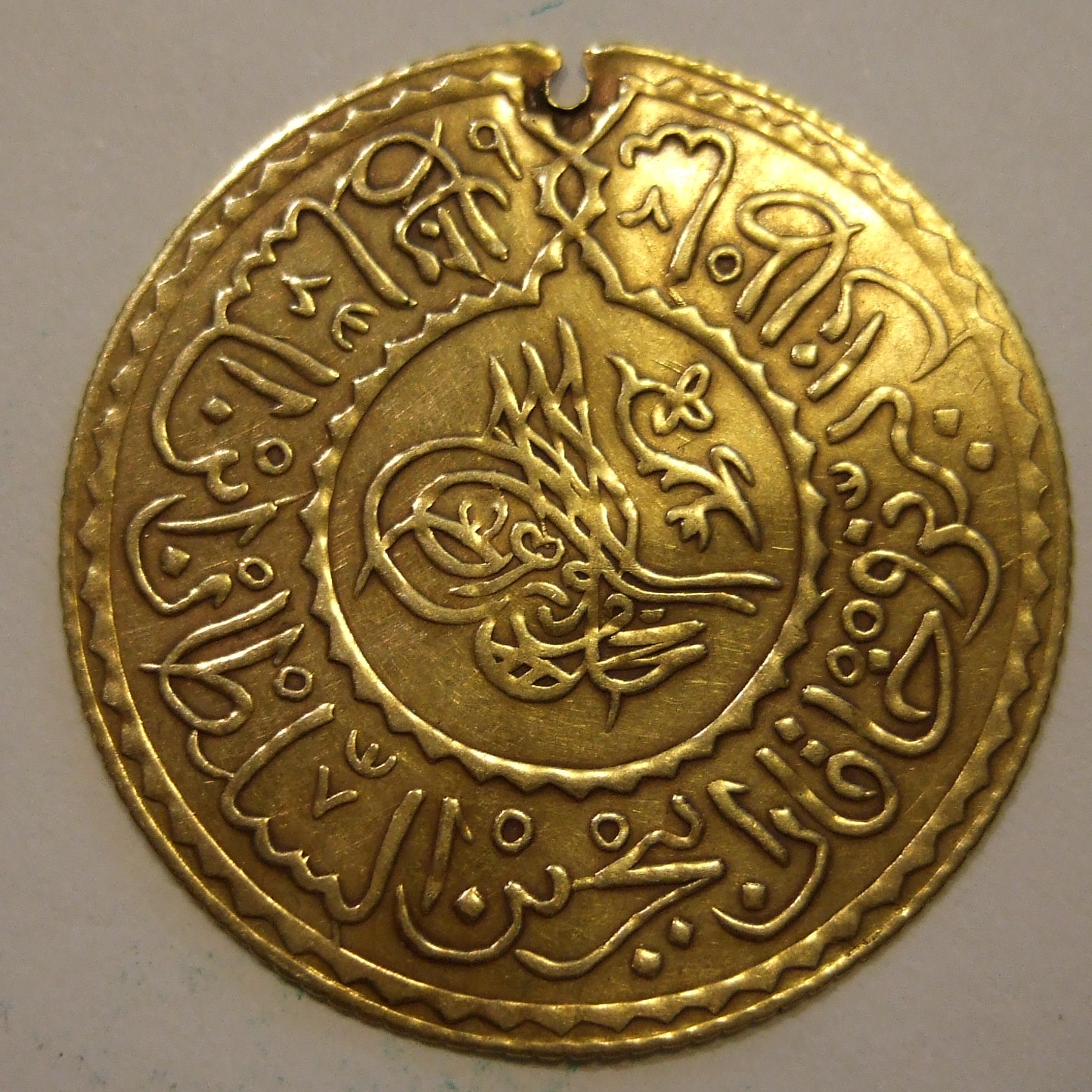
Ottoman coin, 1818

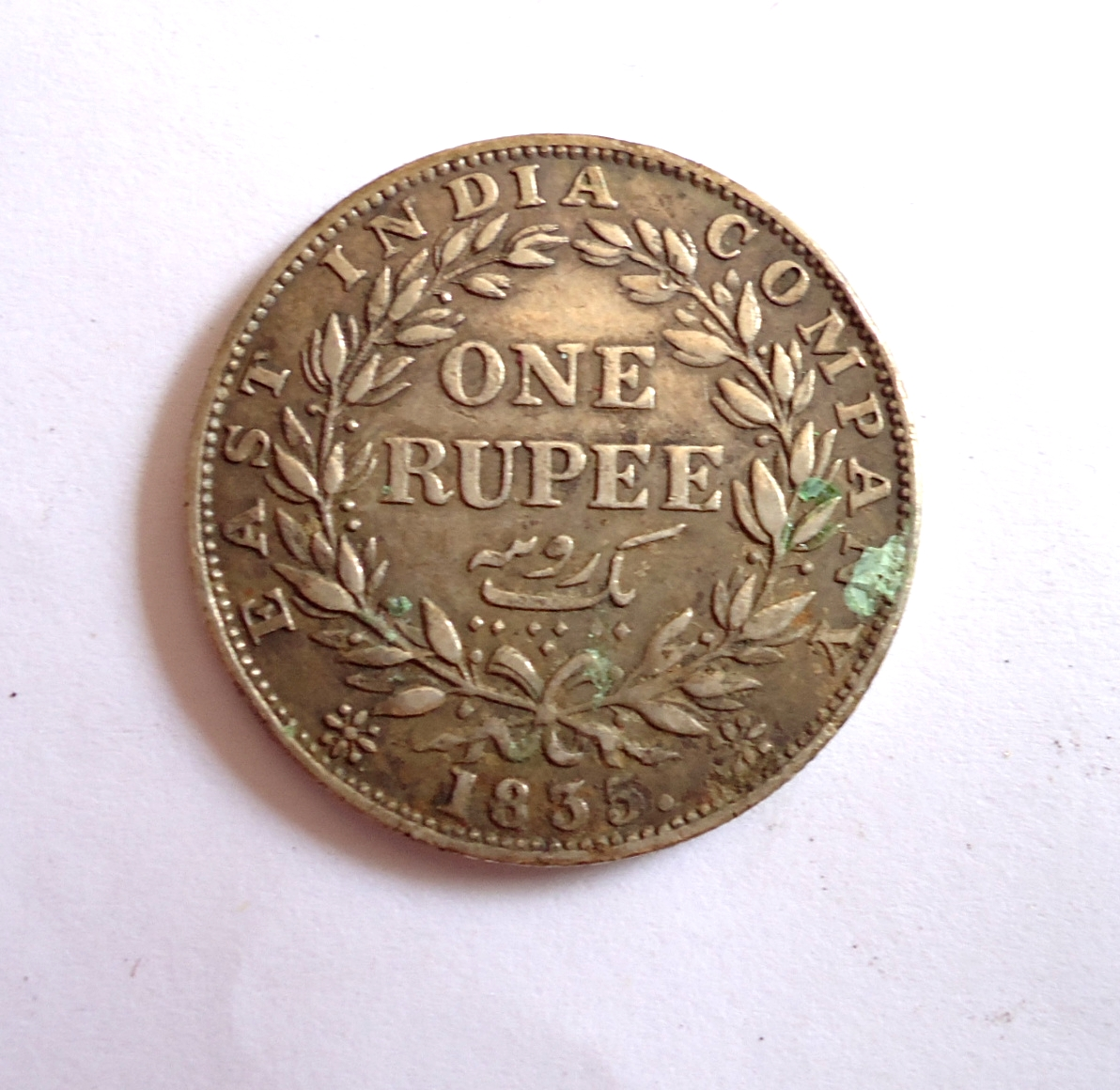
One Rupee coin issued by the East India Company, 1835

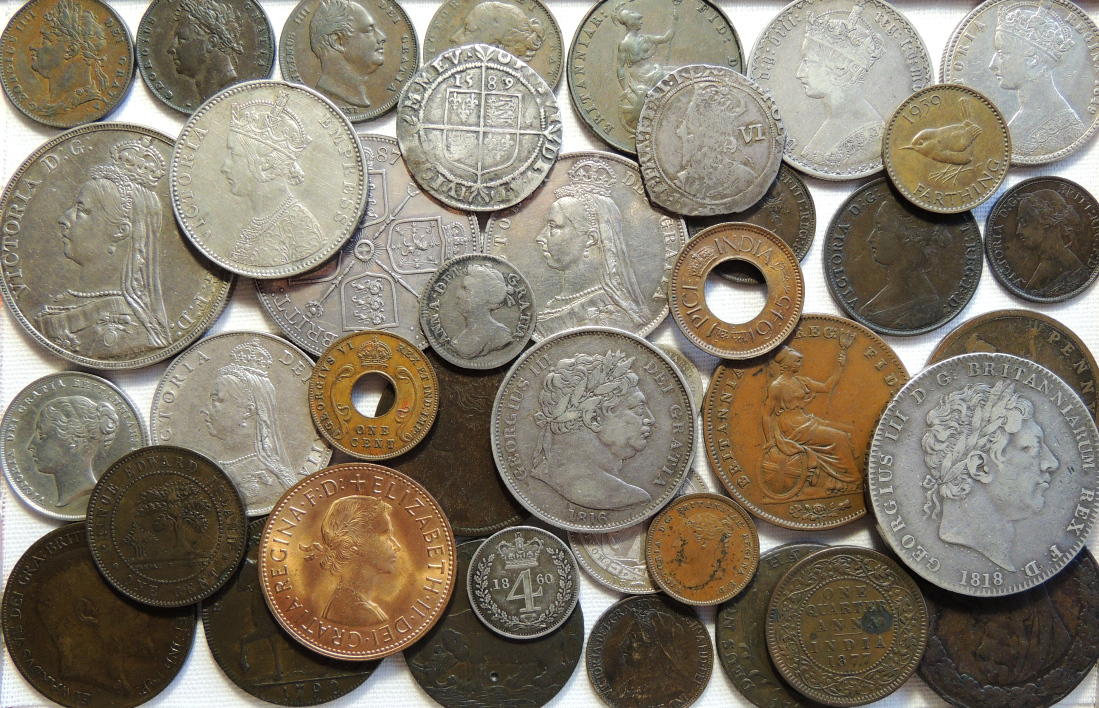
British coins 15-20 centuries

== Value ==
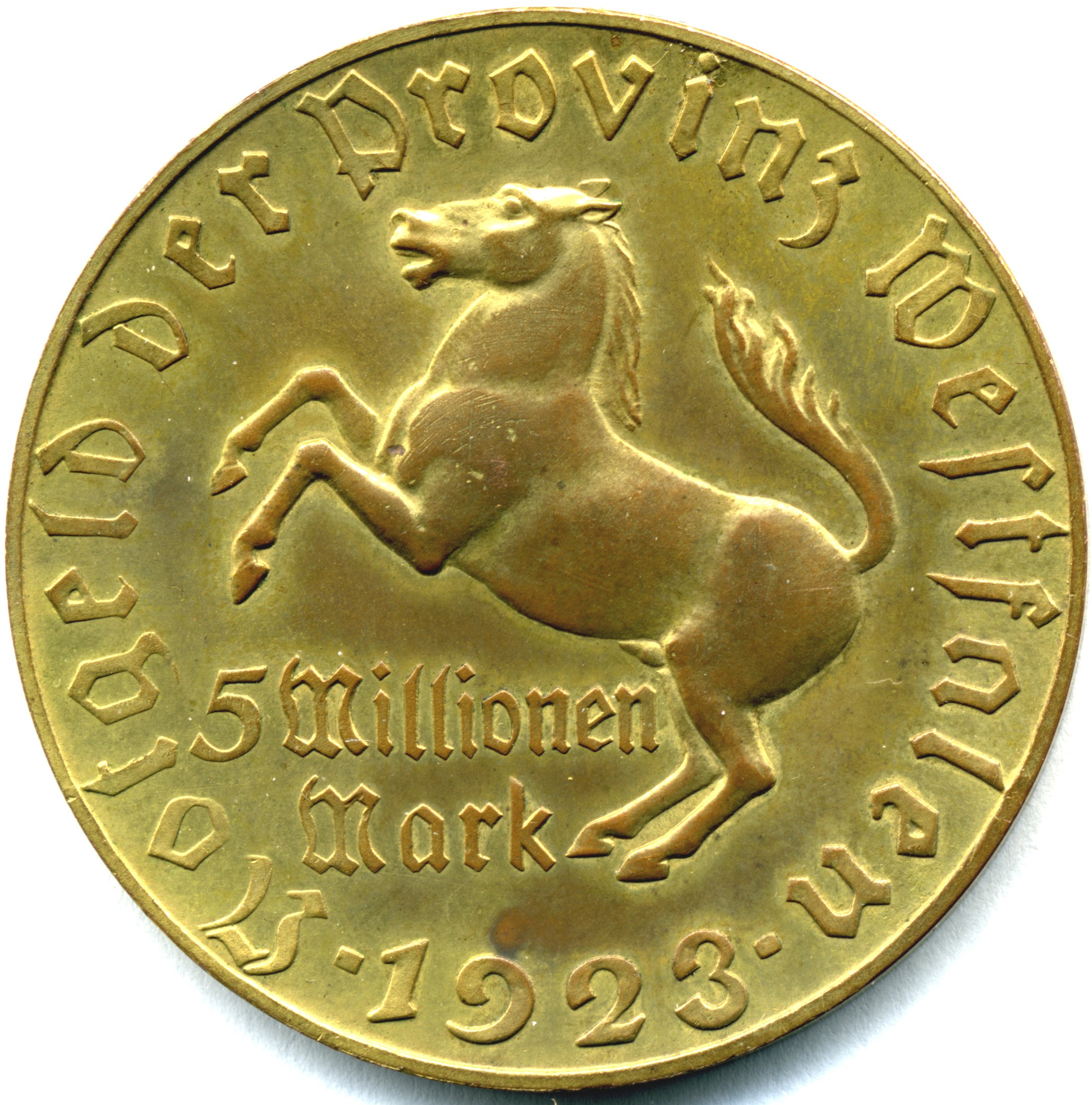
Five million mark coin (Weimar Republic, 1923). Despite its high denomination, this coin's monetary value dropped to a tiny fraction of a US cent by the end of 1923, substantially less than the value of its metallic content.

An unusual copper coin of King
George IV of Georgia with
Georgian inscriptions, 1210

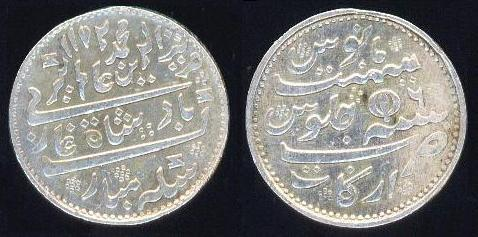
A silver coin made during the reign of the Mughal Emperor Alamgir II (1754–1759)

=== Currency ===
Most coins presently are made of a base metal, and their value comes from their status as fiat money. The value of the coin is established by law, and thus is determined by the free market as national currencies are used in domestic trade and traded in the international market. These coins are monetary tokens, just as paper currency is: their value is usually not backed by metal, but rather by some form of government guarantee.

Coins may be in circulation with face values lower than the value of their component metals due to inflation, as market values for the metal overtake the face value of the coin. Examples are the pre-1965 US dime, quarter, half dollar, and dollar (containing slightly less than a tenth, quarter, half, and full ounce of silver, respectively), US nickel, and pre-1982 US penny. As a result of the increase in the value of copper, the United States greatly reduced the amount of copper in each penny. Since mid-1982, United States pennies are made of 97.5% zinc, with the remaining 2.5% being a coating of copper. Extreme differences between face values and metal values of coins cause coins to be hoarded or removed from circulation by illicit smelters in order to realize the value of their metal content. This is an example of Gresham's law. The United States Mint, in an attempt to avoid this, implemented new interim rules on December 14, 2006, subject to public comment for 30 days, which criminalized the melting and export of pennies and nickels. Violators can be fined up to $10,000 and/or imprisoned for up to five years. In the Code of Federal Regulations (CFR) in the United States, 31 CFR § 82.1 forbids unauthorized persons from exporting, melting, or treating any 5 or 1 cent coins.

=== Collector's items ===
A coin's value as a collector's item or as an investment generally depends on its condition, specific historical significance, rarity, quality, beauty of the design and general popularity with collectors. If a coin is greatly lacking in all of these, it is unlikely to be worth much. The value of bullion coins is also influenced to some extent by those factors, but is largely based on the value of their gold, silver, or platinum content. Sometimes non-monetized bullion coins such as the Canadian Maple Leaf and the American Gold Eagle are minted with nominal face values less than the value of the metal in them, but as such coins are never intended for circulation, these face values have no relevance.

Collector catalogs often include information about coins to assists collectors with identifying and grading. Additional resources can be found online for collectors These are collector clubs, collection management tools, marketplaces, trading platforms, and forums,

=== Debasement and clipping ===
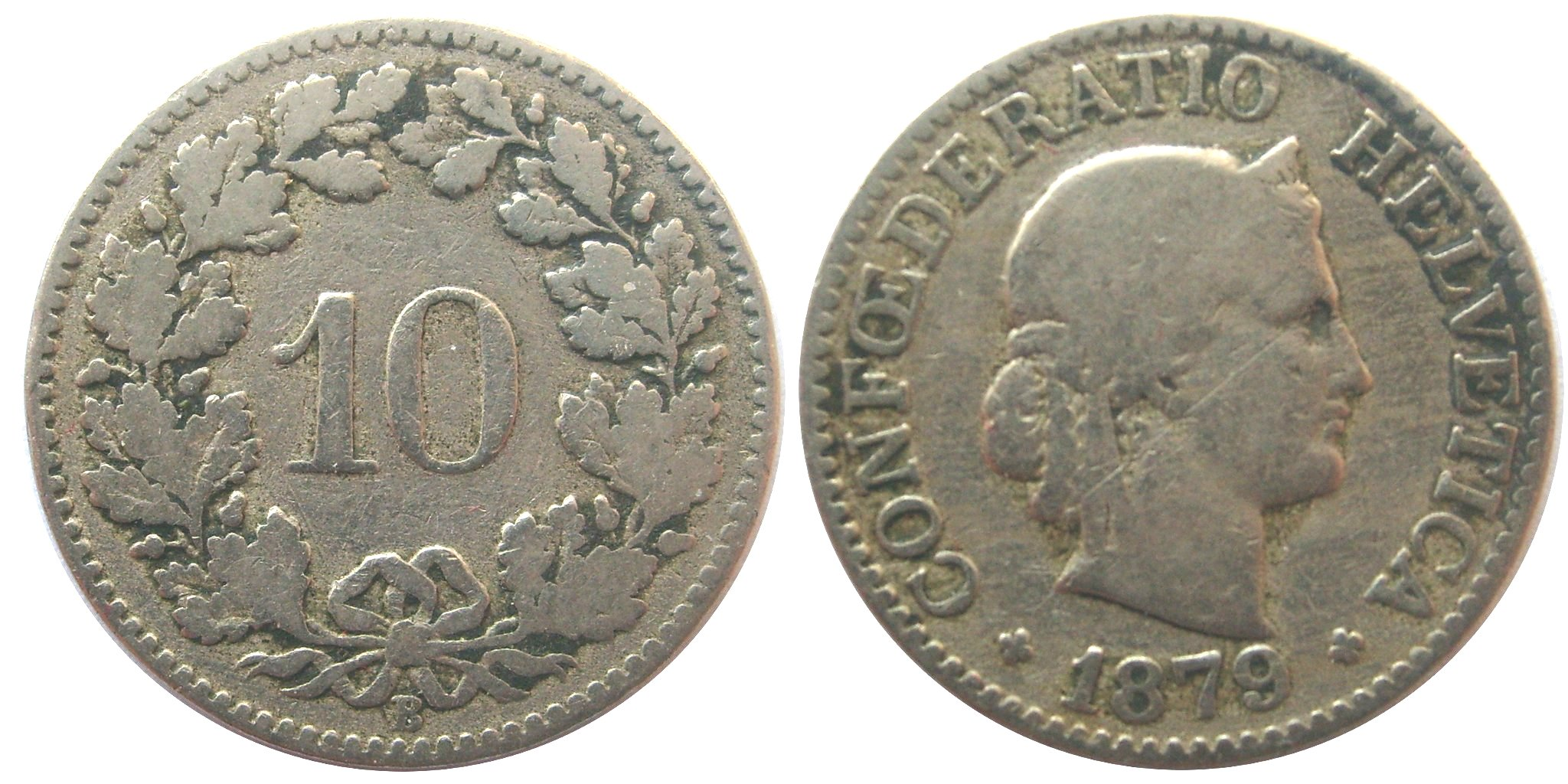
A Swiss ten-cent coin from 1879, similar to the oldest coins still in official use today

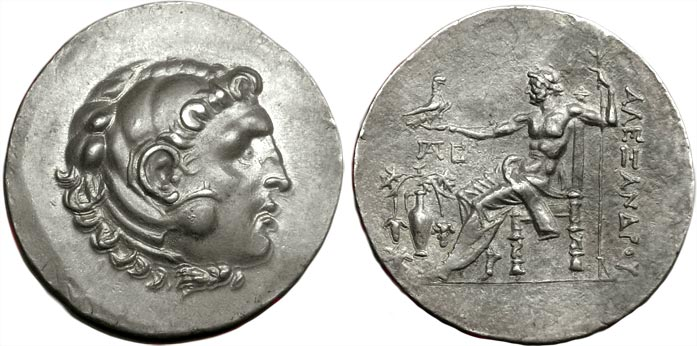
Alexander the Great Tetradrachm from the Temnos Mint, c. 188–170 BC

Throughout history, monarchs and governments have often created more coinage than their supply of precious metals would allow if the coins were pure metal. By replacing some fraction of a coin's precious metal content with a base metal (often copper or nickel), the intrinsic value of each individual coin was reduced (thereby "debasing" the money), allowing the coining authority to produce more coins than would otherwise be possible. Debasement occasionally occurs in order to make the coin physically harder and therefore less likely to be worn down as quickly, but the more usual reason is to profit from the difference between face value and metal value. Debasement of money almost always leads to price inflation. Sometimes price controls are at the same time also instituted by the governing authority, but historically these have generally proved unworkable.

The United States is unusual in that it has only slightly modified its coinage system (except for the images and symbols on the coins, which have changed a number of times) to accommodate two centuries of inflation. The one-cent coin has changed little since 1856 (though its composition was changed in 1982 to remove virtually all copper from the coin) and still remains in circulation, despite a greatly reduced purchasing power. On the other end of the spectrum, the largest coin in common circulation is valued at 25 cents, a very low value for the largest denomination coin compared to many other countries. Increases in the prices of copper, nickel, and zinc meant that both the US one- and five-cent coins became worth more for their raw metal content than their face (fiat) value. In particular, copper one-cent pieces (those dated prior to 1982 and some 1982-dated coins) contained about two cents' worth of copper.

Some denominations of circulating coins that were formerly minted in the United States are no longer made. These include coins with a face value of a half cent, two cents, three cents, and twenty cents. (The half dollar and dollar coins are still produced, but mostly for vending machines and collectors.) In the past, the US also coined the following denominations for circulation in gold: One dollar, $2.50, three dollars, five dollars, ten dollars, and twenty dollars. In addition, cents were originally slightly larger than the modern quarter and weighed nearly half an ounce, while five-cent coins (known then as "half dimes") were smaller than a dime and made of a silver alloy. Dollar coins were also much larger, and weighed approximately an ounce. One-dollar gold coins are no longer produced and rarely used. The US also issues bullion and commemorative coins with the following denominations: 50¢, $1, $5, $10, $25, $50, and $100.

Circulating coins commonly suffered from "shaving" or "clipping": the public would cut off small amounts of precious metal from their edges to sell it and then pass on the mutilated coins at full value. Unmilled British sterling silver coins were sometimes reduced to almost half their minted weight. This form of debasement in Tudor England was commented on by Sir Thomas Gresham, whose name was later attached to Gresham's law. The monarch would have to periodically recall circulating coins, paying only the bullion value of the silver, and reminting them. This, also known as recoinage, is a long and difficult process that was done only occasionally. Many coins have milled or reeded edges, originally designed to make it easier to detect clipping.

=== Cutting ===
Some coins made of precious metals were manufactured with a cross on one side to make it easier to split the coin into halves or quarters.

== Modern features ==
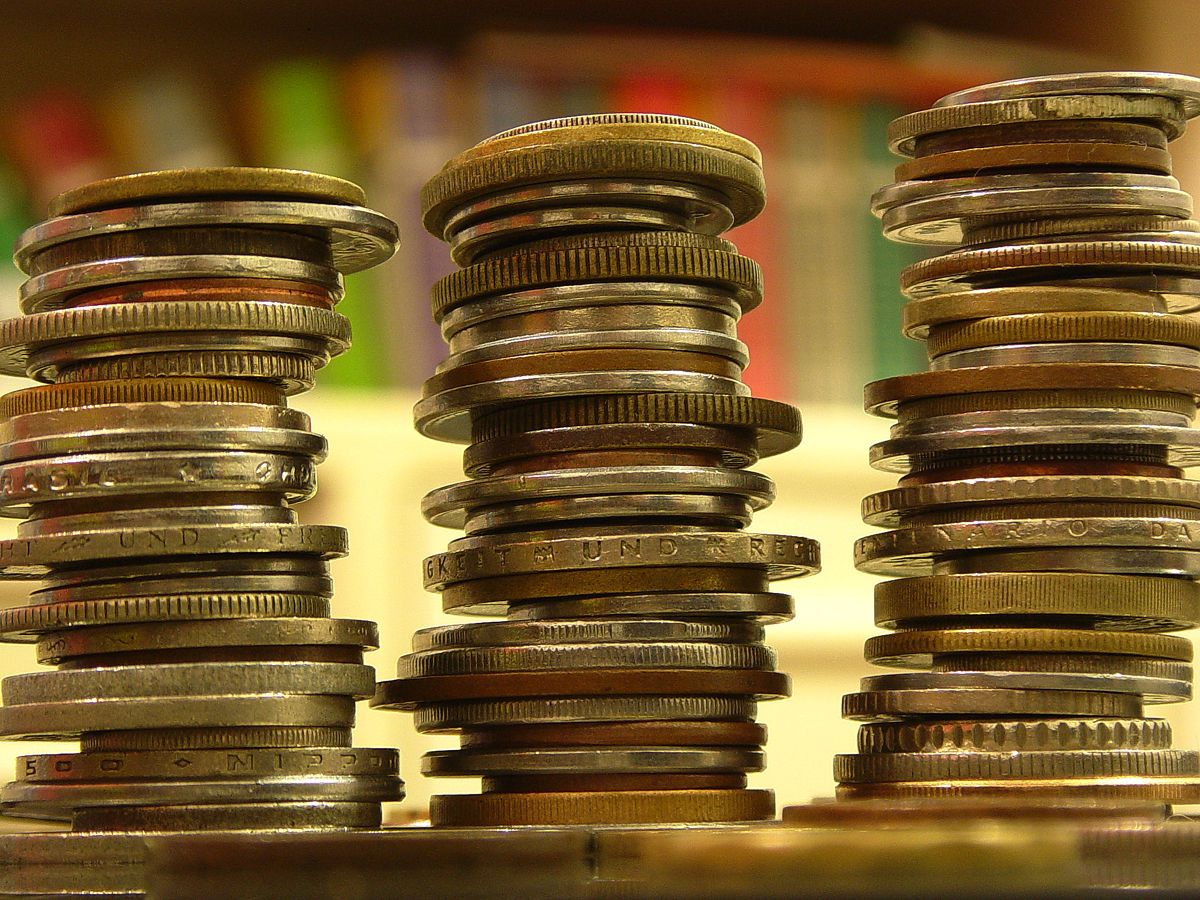
Coins can be stacked.

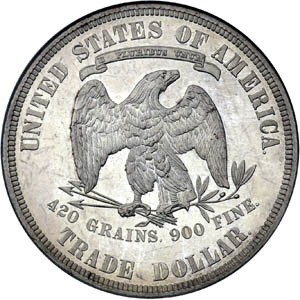
1884 United States trade dollar

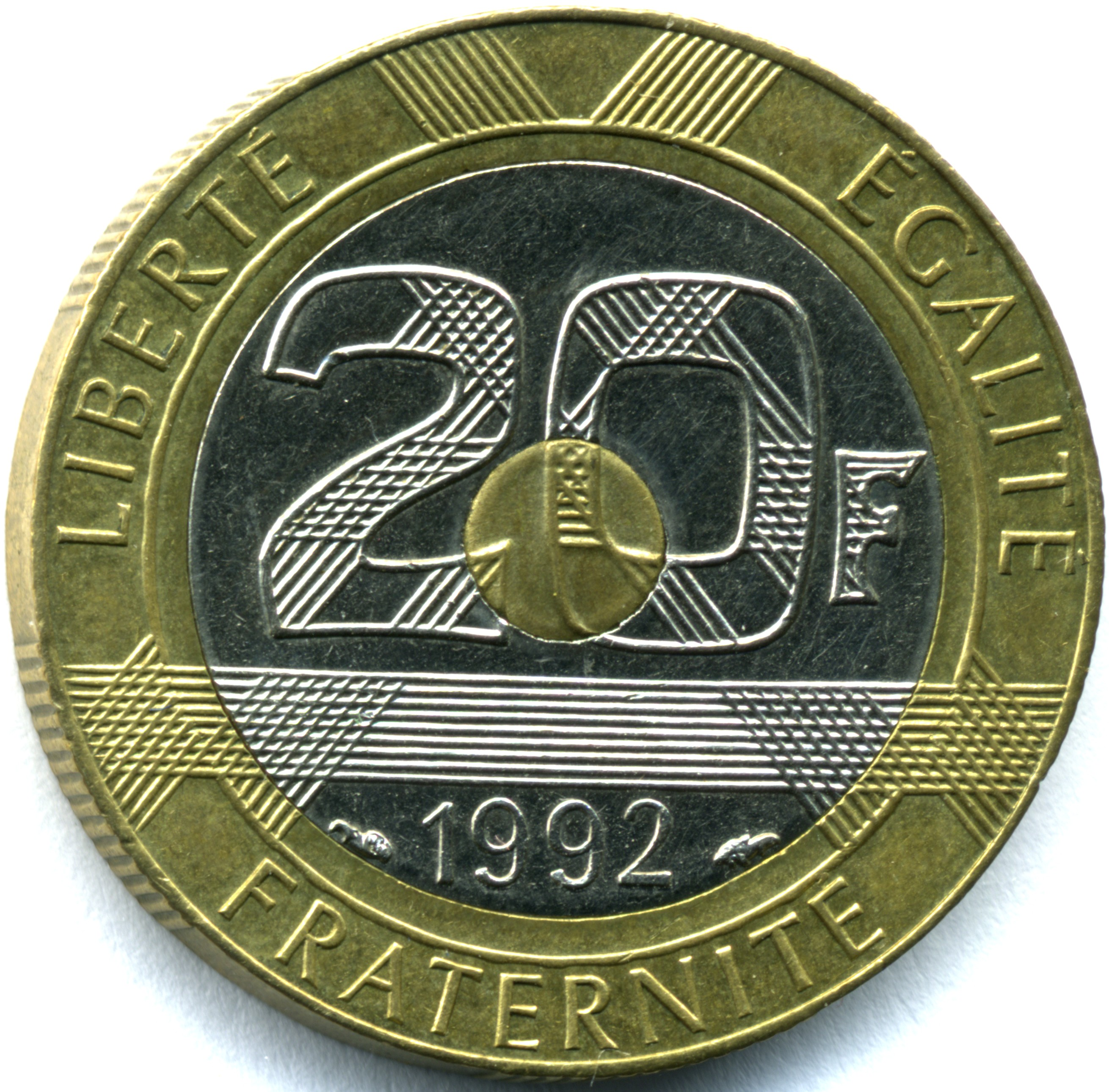
French 1992 twenty Franc Tri-Metallic coin

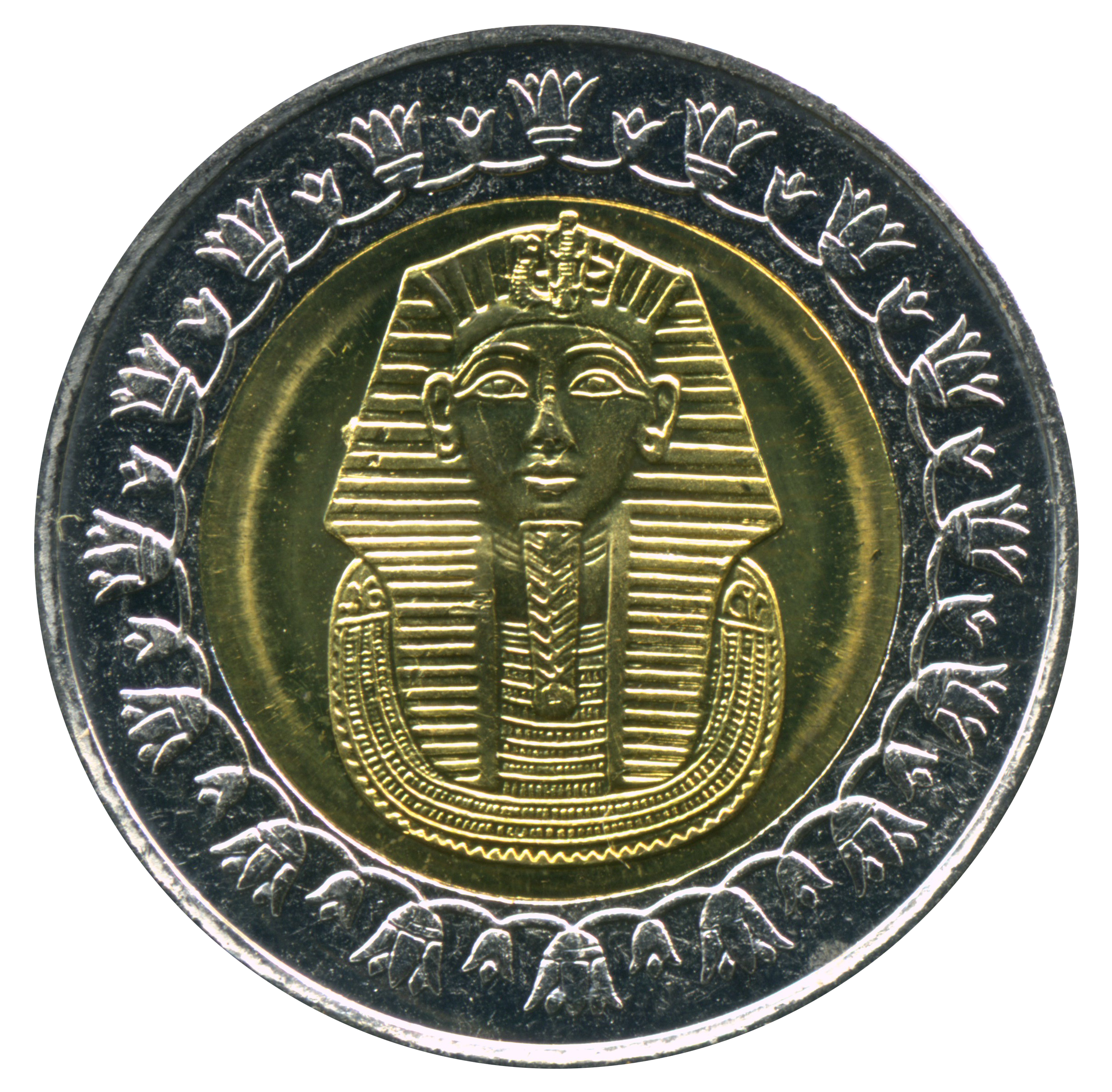
Bimetallic Egyptian one pound coin featuring King Tutankhamen

The side of a coin carrying an image of a monarch, other authority (see List of people on coins), or a national emblem is called the obverse (colloquially, heads); the other side, carrying various types of information, is called the reverse (colloquially, tails). The year of minting is usually shown on the obverse, although some Chinese coins, most Canadian coins, the pre-2008 British 20p coin, the post-1999 American quarter, and all Japanese coins are exceptions.

The relation of the images on the obverse and reverse of a coin is the coin's orientation. If the image on the obverse of the coin is right side up and turning the coin left or right on its vertical axis reveals that the reverse of the coin is also right side up, then the coin is said to have medallic orientation—typical of the Euro and pound sterling; if, however, turning the coin left or right shows that the reverse image is upside down, then the coin is said to have coin orientation, characteristic of the coins of the United States dollar.

Bimetallic coins are sometimes used for higher values and for commemorative purposes. In the 1990s, France used a tri-metallic coin. Common circulating bimetallic examples include the €1, €2, British £1, £2 and Canadian $2 and several peso coins in Mexico.

The exergue is the space on a coin beneath the main design, often used to show the coin's date, although it is sometimes left blank or contains a mint mark, privy mark, or some other decorative or informative design feature. Many coins do not have an exergue at all, especially those with few or no legends, such as the Victorian bun penny.

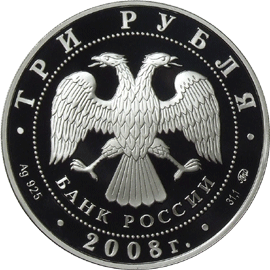
3 Rubles proof coin of Russia, minted in 2008

Not all coins are round; they come in a variety of shapes. The Australian 50-cent coin, for example, has twelve flat sides. Some coins have wavy edges, e.g. the $2 and 20-cent coins of Hong Kong and the 10-cent coins of Bahamas. Some are square-shaped, such as the 15-cent coin of the Bahamas and the 50-cent coin from Aruba. During the 1970s, Swazi coins were minted in several shapes, including squares, polygons, and wavy edged circles with 8 and 12 waves.

Historically, a considerable variety of coinage metals (including alloys) and other materials (e.g. porcelain) have been used to produce coins for circulation, collection, and metal investment: bullion coins often serve as more convenient stores of assured metal quantity and purity than other bullion.

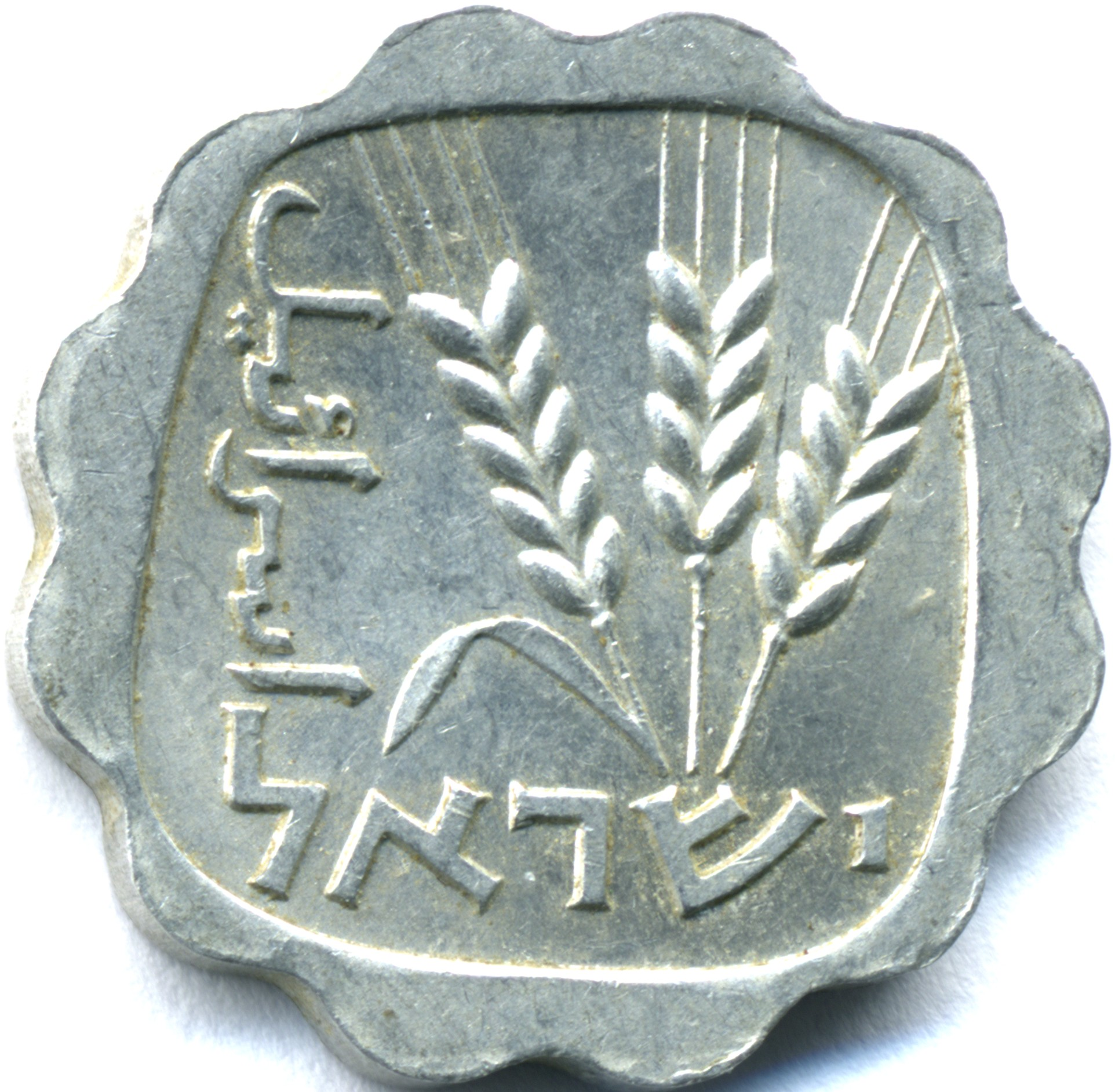
Scalloped coin of Israel

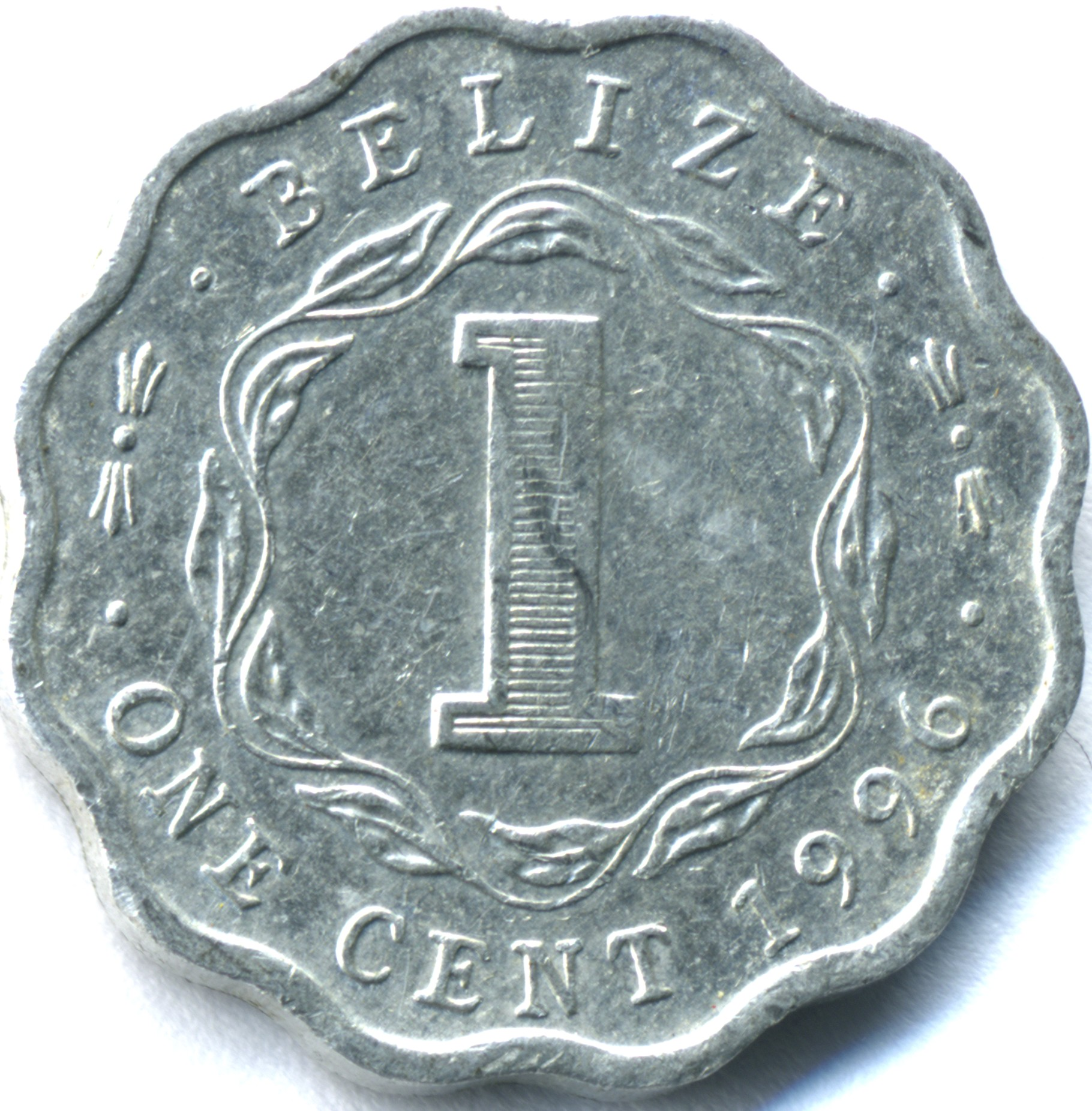
1996 one cent coin from Belize

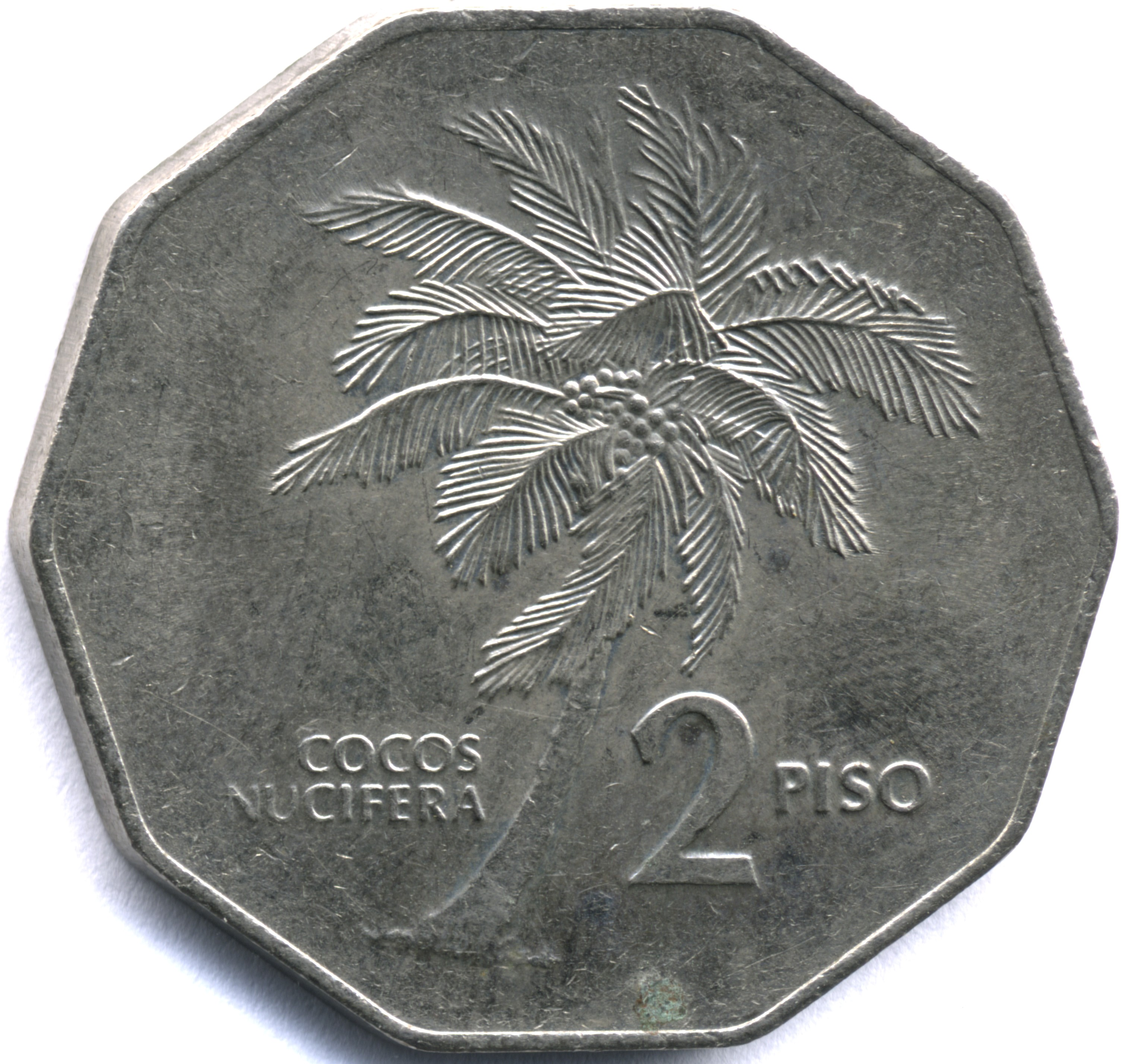
Decagonal two Piso Philippine coin 1990

Some other coins, like the British 20 and 50 pence coins and the Canadian Loonie, have an odd number of sides, with the edges rounded off. This way the coin has a constant diameter, recognizable by vending machines whichever direction it is inserted.

A triangular coin with a face value of £5 (produced to commemorate the 2007/2008 Tutankhamun exhibition at The O2 Arena) was commissioned by the Isle of Man: it became legal tender on 6 December 2007. Other triangular coins issued earlier include: Cabinda coin, Bermuda coin, 2 Dollar Cook Islands 1992 triangular coin, Uganda Millennium Coin and Polish Sterling-Silver 10-Zloty Coin.

Some medieval coins, called bracteates, were so thin they were struck on only one side.

Many coins over the years have been manufactured with integrated holes such as Chinese "cash" coins, Japanese coins, Colonial French coins, etc. This may have been done to permit their being strung on cords, to facilitate storage and being carried. Nowadays, holes help to differentiate coins of similar size and metal, such as the Japanese 50 yen and 100 yen coin.

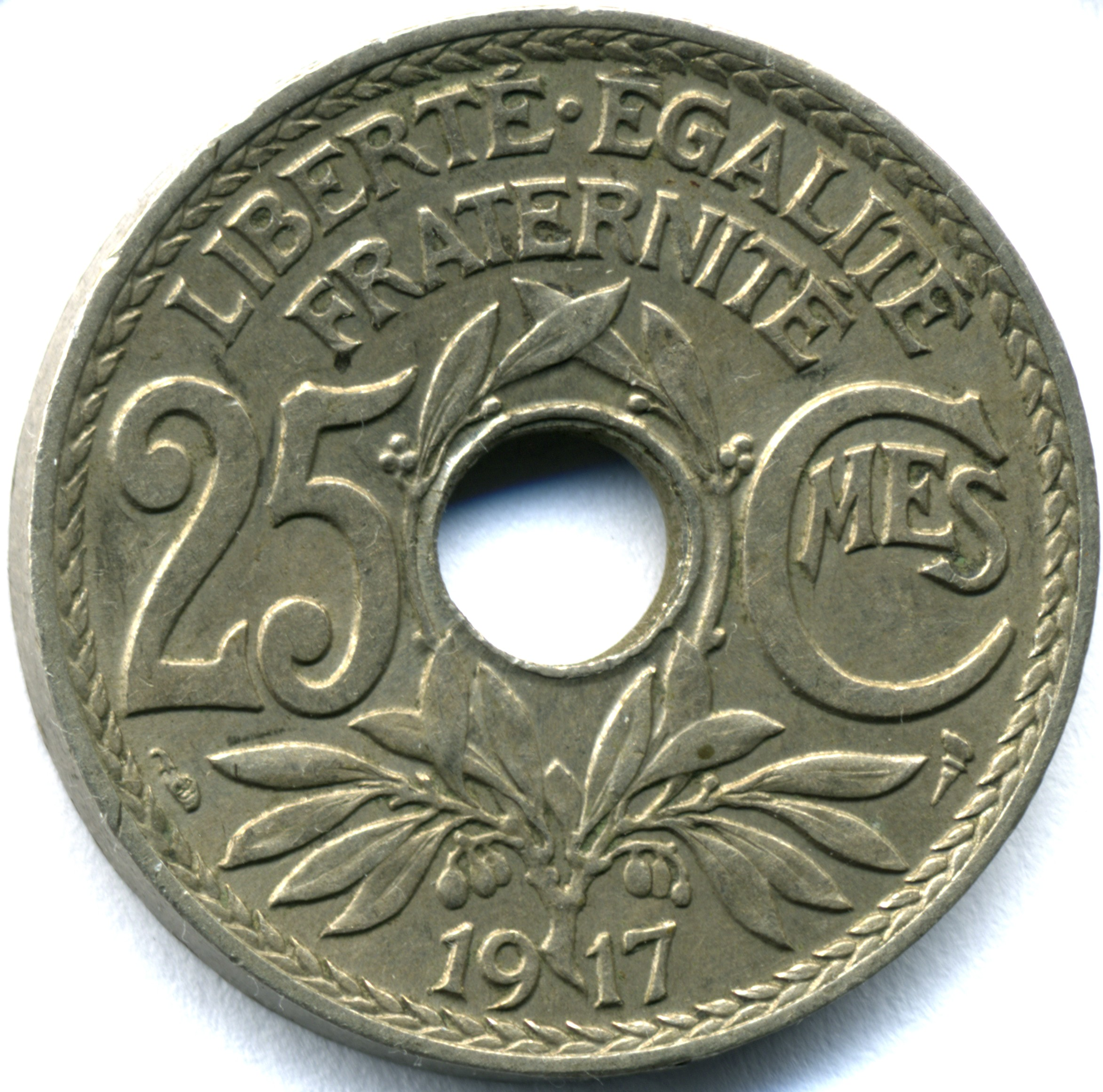
1917 French coin with integrated hole

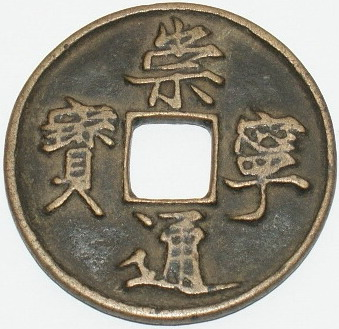
Chinese cash coin, 1102–1106

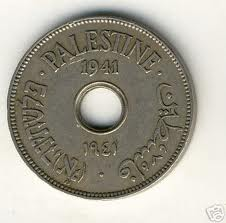
1941 British Palestine coin

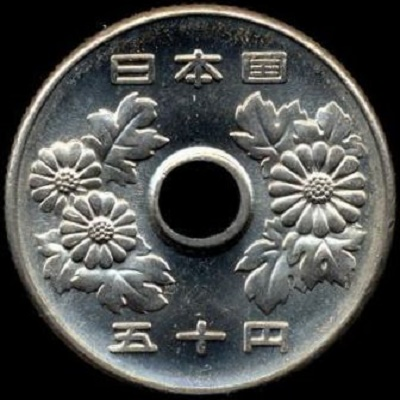
Modern-day Japanese 50-yen coin

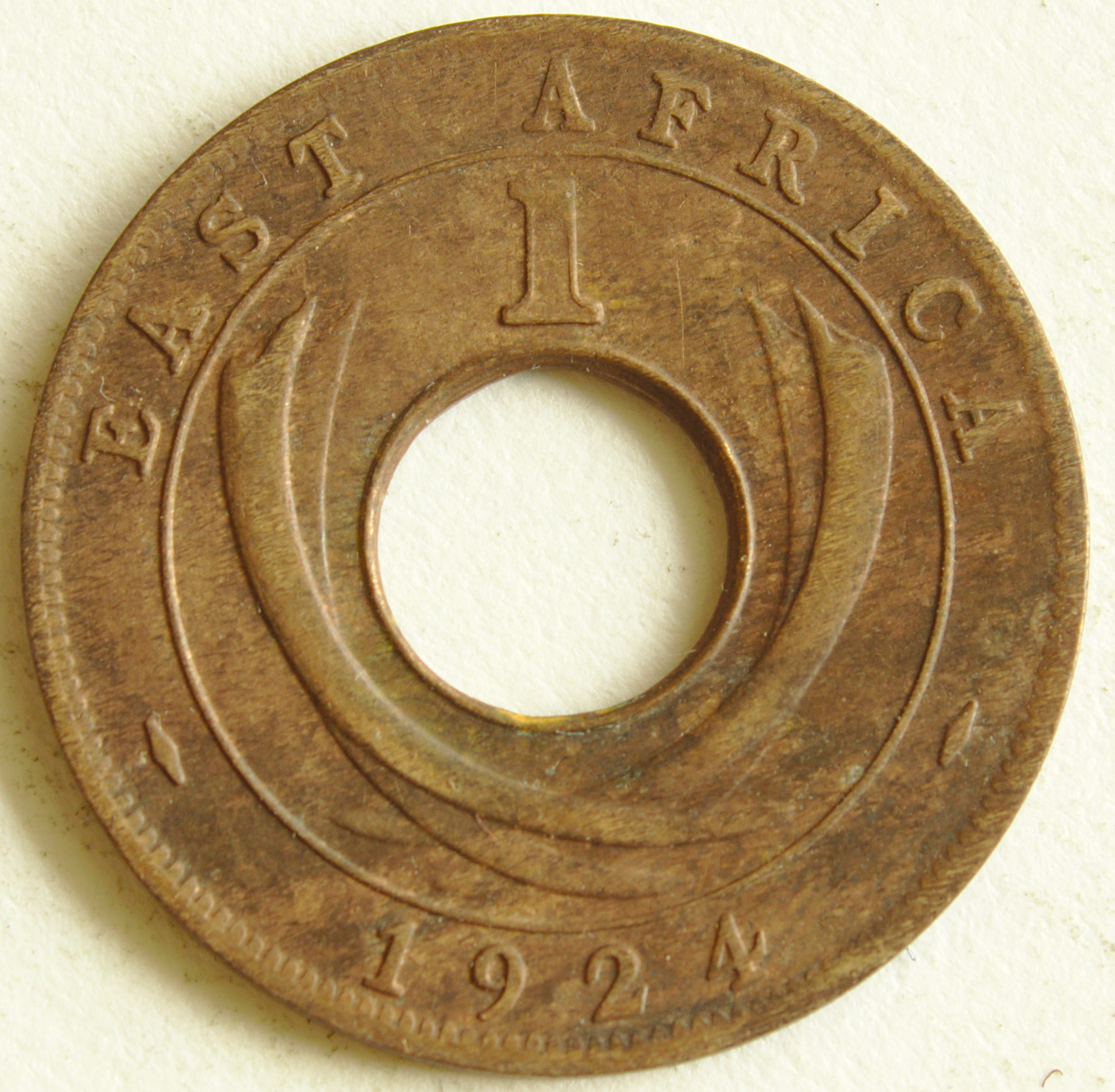
1924 East African coin

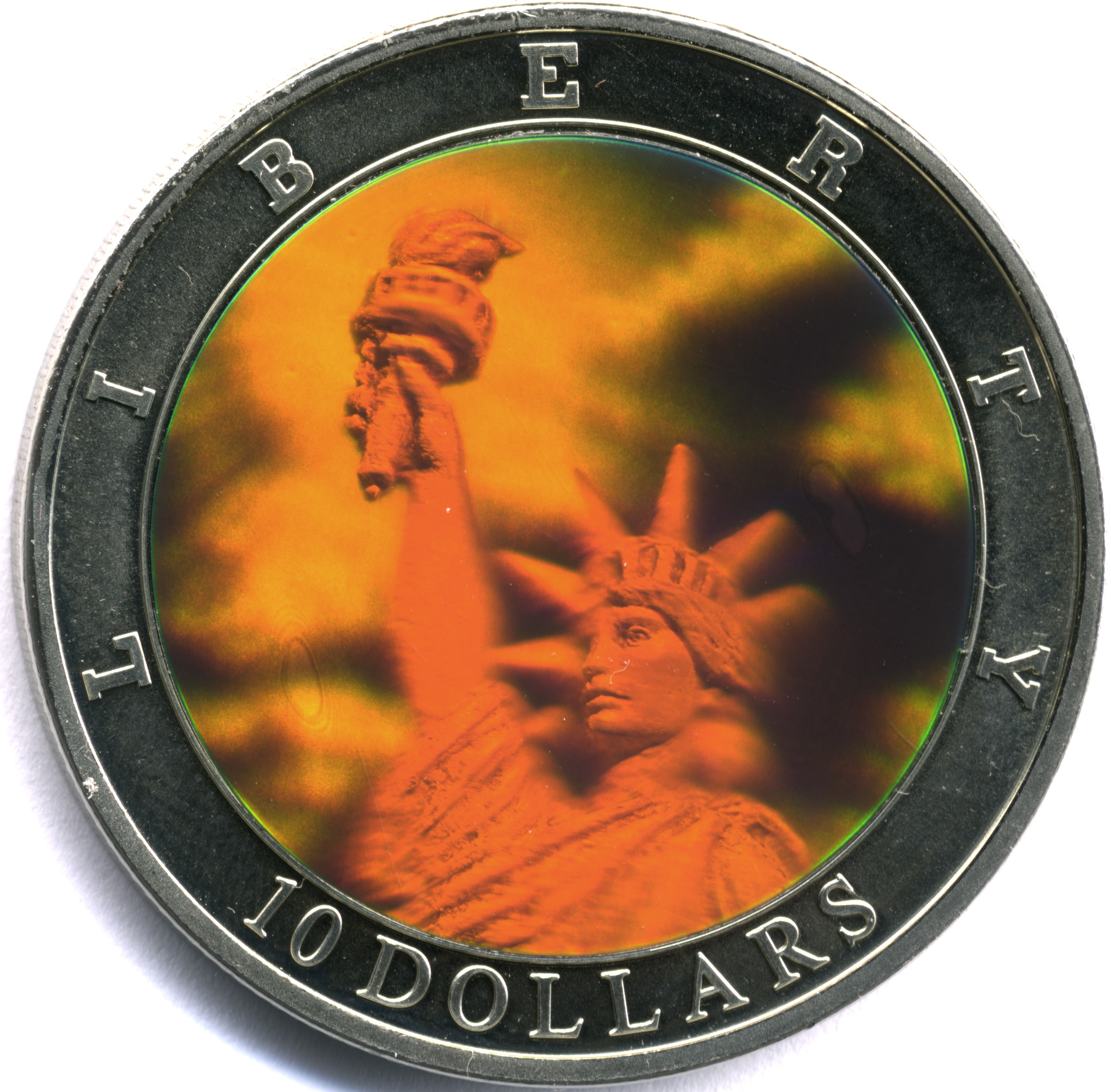
Holographic coin from Liberia features the Statue of Liberty (Liberty Enlightening the World)

The Royal Canadian Mint is now able to produce holographic-effect gold and silver coinage. However, this procedure is not limited to only bullion or commemorative coinage. The 500 yen coin from Japan was subject to a massive amount of counterfeiting. The Japanese government in response produced a circulatory coin with a holographic image.

The Royal Canadian Mint has also released several coins that are colored, the first of which was in commemoration of Remembrance Day. The subject was a colored poppy on the reverse of a 25-cent piece minted through a patented process.

An example of non-metallic composite coins (sometimes incorrectly called plastic coins) was introduced into circulation in Transnistria on 22 August 2014. Most of these coins are also non-circular, with different shapes corresponding to different coin values.

For a list of many pure metallic elements and their alloys which have been used in actual circulation coins and for trial experiments, see coinage metals.

== Other uses ==
=== Media of expression ===
Coins can be used as creative media of expression – from fine art sculpture to the penny machines that can be found in amusement parks. Hobo nickels and love tokens are art objects carved from coins.

In the United States, such alterations are legal. 31 CFR § 82.2(b) states that: "The prohibition contained in § 82.1 against the treatment of 5-cent coins and one-cent coins shall not apply to the treatment of these coins for educational, amusement, novelty, jewelry, and similar purposes as long as the volumes treated and the nature of the treatment makes it clear that such treatment is not intended as a means by which to profit solely from the value of the metal content of the coins."

Love tokens created by convicts from the British Isles who were sentenced to transportation to Australia in the 18th and 19th centuries used coins to leave messages of remembrance to loved ones left behind in Britain. The coins were defaced, smoothed and inscribed, either by stippling or engraving, with sometimes touching words of loss. These coins were called "convict love tokens" or "leaden hearts". Some of these tokens are in the collection of the National Museum of Australia.

=== Cultural references ===
Coins have been depicted in art and literature. A roman sestertius is shown in the painting Portrait of a Man with a Roman Coin by Memling. An Ecuadorian gold doubloon plays a key role in the novel Moby-Dick. Coins appear in the New Testament; for example, the thirty pieces of silver (possibly Tyrian shekels) exemplify Judas's betrayal and two leptons (the widow's mite) demonstrate true generosity. In Ancient Greek funeral and burial practices, an obol was often placed on or in the mouth.

== Physics and chemistry ==
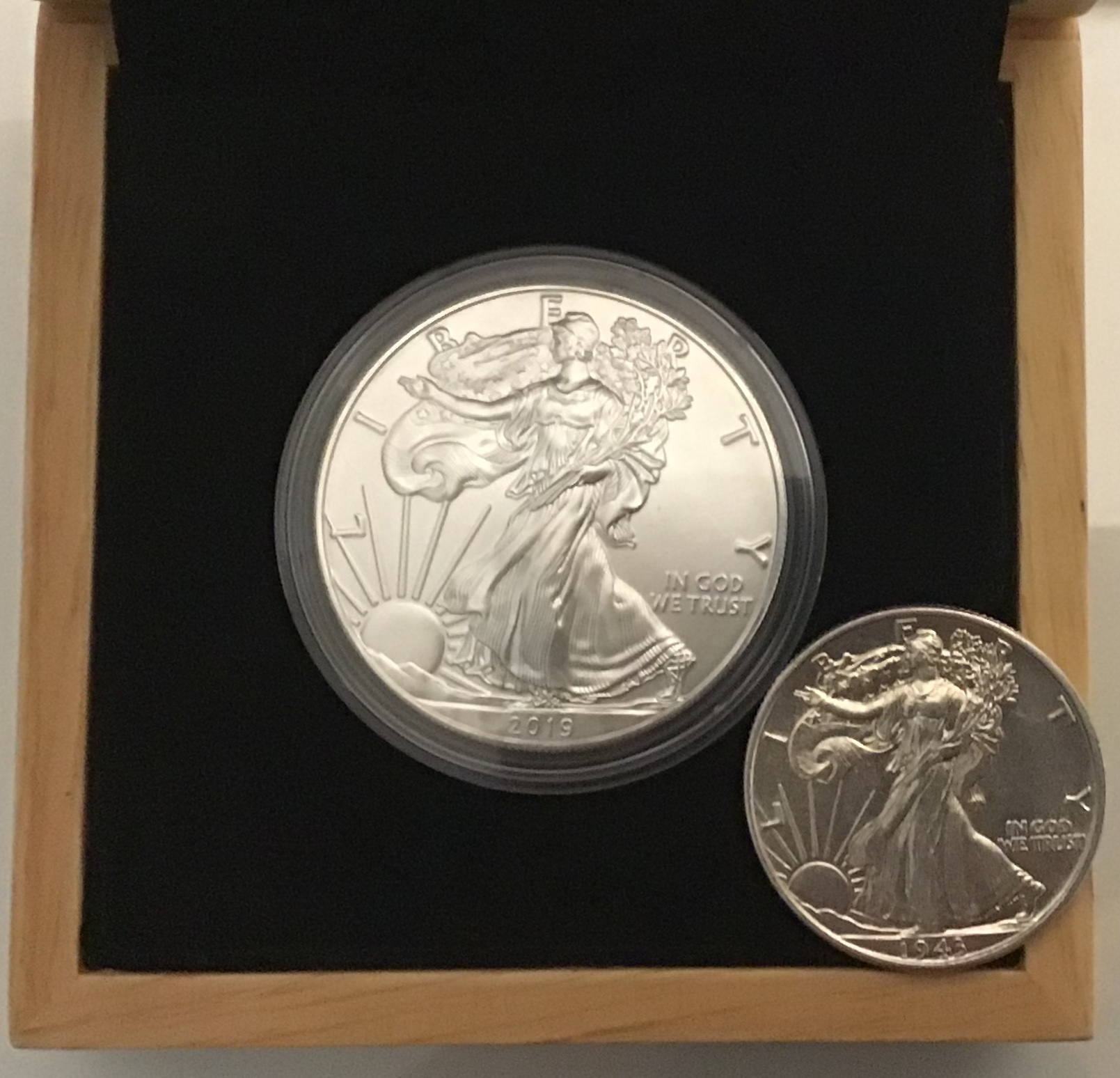
An American Silver Eagle minted in 2019 (left), an example of a Bullion coin. Its obverse design is based on the older, formerly circulating silver Walking Liberty half dollar (right).

=== Flipping ===
To flip a coin to see whether it lands heads or tails is to use it as a two-sided die in what is known in mathematics as a Bernoulli trial: if the probability of heads (in the parlance of Bernoulli trials, a "success") is exactly 0.5, the coin is fair.

=== Spinning ===
Coins can also be spun on a flat surface such as a table. This results in the following phenomenon: as the coin falls over and rolls on its edge, it spins faster and faster (formally, the precession rate of the symmetry axis of the coin, i.e., the axis passing from one face of the coin to the other) before coming to an abrupt stop. This is mathematically modeled as a finite-time singularity – the precession rate is accelerating to infinity, before it suddenly stops, and has been studied using high speed photography and devices such as Euler's Disk. The slowing down is predominantly caused by rolling friction (air resistance is minor), and the singularity (divergence of the precession rate) can be modeled as a power law with exponent approximately −1/3.

=== Odor ===
Iron and copper coins have a characteristic metallic smell that is produced upon contact with oils in the skin. Perspiration is chemically reduced upon contact with these metals, which causes the skin oils to decompose, forming with iron the volatile molecule 1-octen-3-one.

== Regional examples ==
=== Philippines ===
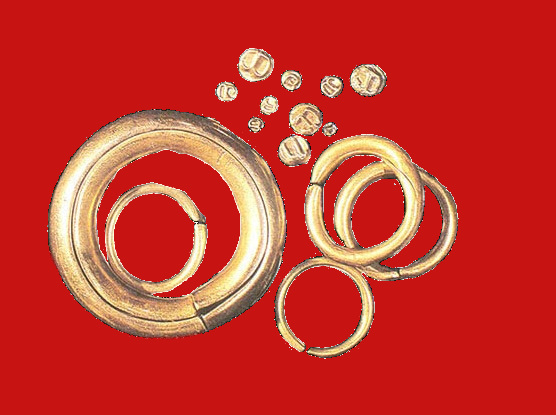
The Piloncitos are tiny engraved gold coins found in the Philippines, along with barter rings, which are gold ring-like ingots. These barter rings are bigger than softballs in size and are made of pure gold from the Archaic period (c. 10th to 16th century).

In the Philippines, small, engraved gold coins called Piloncitos have been excavated, some as lightweight as 0.09 to 2.65 grams. Piloncitos have been unearthed from Mandaluyong, Bataan, the banks of the Pasig River, Batangas, Marinduque, Samar, Leyte and some areas in Mindanao. Large quantities were found in Indonesian archaeological sites, suggesting that they may not have originated in the Philippines, but rather were imported. However, numerous Spanish accounts state that the gold coins were mined and made in the Philippines, such as the following from 1586:

The people of this island (Luzon) are very skillful in their handling of gold. They weigh it with the greatest skill and delicacy that have ever been seen. The first thing they teach their children is the knowledge of gold and the weights with which they weigh it, for there is no other money among them.

The term "Piloncitos" is a contemporary word, used by modern-day antique collectors, who thought that the cone-shaped pieces looked like a pilon of sugar. Early historical descriptions of the term include the Spanish "granitas de oro" (small grains of gold), or simply by whatever local language terms were used to mean "gold" in those times, such as "bulawan."

Piloncitos are presumably an offshoot of silver coinage and may have evolved into the bullet or pod duang coinage of Sukhothai in Thailand.

Early historical records document the extensive use of gold throughout the Philippine archipelago before the arrival of European colonists. It was used extensively as currency, and also used in everyday items such as clothing and finery.

== See also ==
- Bi-metallic coin
- Coin base weight
- Coin collecting
- Coin counter
- Coin counterfeiting
- Coin magic
- Coin sorter
- Coin standard
- Currency
- Hanukkah gelt – Chocolate coin
- History of coins
- Legal tender
- List of currencies
- List of circulating currencies
- List of mints
- List of most expensive coins
- Mint
- Money
- Seigniorage
- Token coin
- Ten-cent coin

== Bibliography ==
- Angus, Ian (1973). Coins and money tokens. London: Ward Lock. ISBN 0-7063-1811-0.
- Bopearachchi, Osmund (2000), "Coin Production and Circulation in Central Asia and North-West India (Before and after Alexander's Conquest)", Indologica Taurinensia, 25, International Association of Sanskrit Studies
