= Baltar =

Baltar may refer to:

- Amelita Baltar, Argentine tango singer
- Lord Baltar, villain of the original 1978 TV series Battlestar Galactica
- Gaius Baltar, villain of the reimagined 2004 TV series Battlestar Galactica
- Baltar, Ourense, a town in Galicia, Spain
- Baltar (Paredes), a parish of the municipality of Paredes, Portugal

== See also ==
- Baaltars, a deity of the Persian Empire
- Beltar (disambiguation)
