= Bland–Allison Act =

1878 United States law on monetary policy

- Long title: An Act to authorize the coinage of the standard silver dollar, and to restore its legal-tender character.
- Enacted by: the 45th United States Congress
- Effective: February 28, 1878

Citations
- Public law: 45–20
- Statutes at Large: 20 Stat. 25

Legislative history
- Introduced in the House as H.R. 1093; Passed the House on November 5, 1877 (163–34); Passed the Senate on February 15, 1878 (48–21) with amendment; House agreed to Senate amendment on February 21, 1878 (passed); Vetoed by President Rutherford B. Hayes on February 28, 1878; Overridden by the House on February 28, 1878 (196–73); Overridden by the Senate and became law on February 28, 1878 (46–19)

The Bland–Allison Act, also referred to as the Grand Bland Plan of 1878, was an act of the United States Congress requiring the U.S. Treasury to buy a certain amount of silver and put it into circulation as silver dollars. Though the bill was vetoed by President Rutherford B. Hayes, the Congress overrode Hayes's veto on February 28, 1878, to enact the law. The text of the act can be found in the Congressional Record under the further reading section of this article.

== Background ==
The 5 1/2-year depression following the Panic of 1873 caused cheap-money advocates (led by Representative Richard P. Bland, a Democrat of Missouri), to join with silver-producing interests in urging a return to bimetallism, the use of both silver and gold as a standard. Coupled with Senator William B. Allison of Iowa, they agreed to a proposal that allowed silver to be purchased at market rates, metals to be minted into silver dollars, and required the US Treasury to purchase between $2 million to $4 million silver each month from western mines. President Rutherford B. Hayes, who held interests in industrials and banking, vetoed the measure, which was overturned by Congress. As a result, the Hayes administration purchased the limited amount of silver each month. This act helped restore bimetallism with gold and silver both supporting the currency. However, gold remained heavily favored over silver, paving way for the gold standard.

== Free-silver movement ==
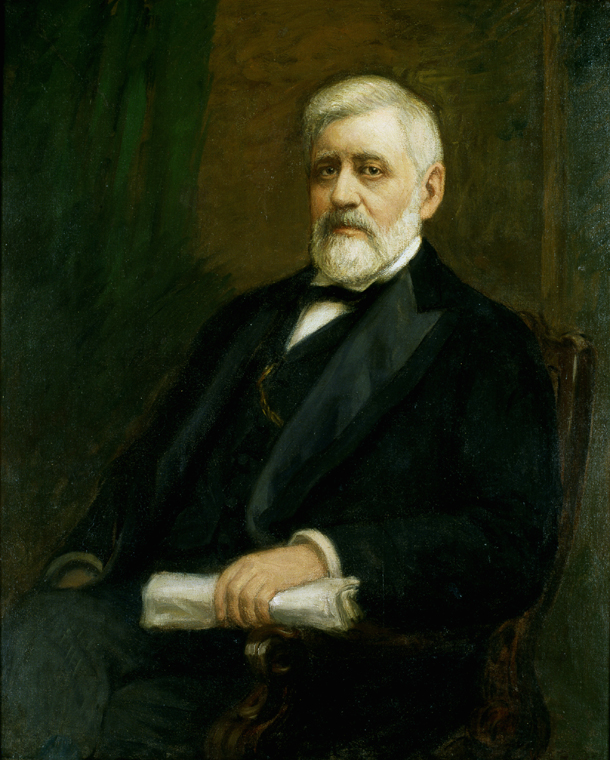
Portrait of Senator Allison which hangs in the U.S. Capitol.

The free-silver movement of the late 19th century advocated the unlimited coinage of silver, which would have resulted in inflationary monetary policy. In 1873, Congress had removed the use of silver dollar from the list of authorized coins under the Coinage Act of 1873 (referred to by opponents as 'the Crime of '73'"). Although the Bland–Allison Act of 1878 directed the Treasury to purchase silver from the "best-western" miners, President Grover Cleveland unparalleled the act in 1893. Advocates of free silver included owners of silver mines in the West, farmers who believed an inclusion of silver would increase crop prices, and debtors who believed it would alleviate their debts. Although the free silver movement ended, the debate of inflation and monetary policy continues to this day.

== Coinage Act of 1873 ==
The Fourth Coinage Act acknowledged the gold standard over silver. Those who advocated for silver labeled this act as the Crime of '73. As a result of demonetized silver, gold became the only metallic standard in the United States and became the default standard. The price of gold was more stable than that of silver, largely due to silver discoveries in Nevada and other places in the West, and the ratio of the gold price to the silver price increased from 16-to-1 in 1873 to nearly 30-to-1 by 1893. The term limping bimetallism describes this problem. The U.S. government finally ceded to pressure from the western mining states and the Bland–Allison Act went into effect in 1878. The law was replaced in 1890 by the similar Sherman Silver Purchase Act, which in turn was repealed by Congress in 1893. These were two instances where the United States attempted to establish bimetallic standards in the long run.

== Reactions and economic impact ==
Western miners and debtors regarded the Bland–Allison Act as an insufficient measure to enforce unlimited coinage of silver, but opponents repealed the act and advocated for the gold standard. The effect of the Bland–Allison act was also blunted by the minimal purchase of silver required by the Hayes administration. Although the act was a near turning point for bimetallism, gold continued to be favored over the bimetallism standard.

Throughout 1860 to 1871, several attempts were made by the Treasury to establish the bimetallic standard by having gold and silver dollar coins. However, the discovery of silver led to an influx of supply, lowering the price of silver. The eventual removal of the bimetallic standard, including the Bland–Allison Act and the acceptance of the gold standard formed the monetary stability in the late 19th century.

The limitation placed on the supply of new notes and the Treasury control over the issue of new notes allowed for economic stability. Prior to the acceptance, the devaluation of silver forced local governments into a financial turmoil. In addition, there was a need for money supply to increase as the credit system expanded and large banks established themselves across states.

In addition, the priority that was placed on the coinage of silver dollars left very little available silver for the coinage of silver coins of lesser denominations, particularly half dollars and quarters. As a result, these coins had extremely low mintages (fewer than 5,000 half dollars were struck in 1879, 1882, and 1884, and 5,000 quarters were struck in 1886) until the Barber coinage began in 1892.

== See also ==
- Specie Payment Resumption Act (1875)
