= Croeseid =

Lydian coin

Croeseid

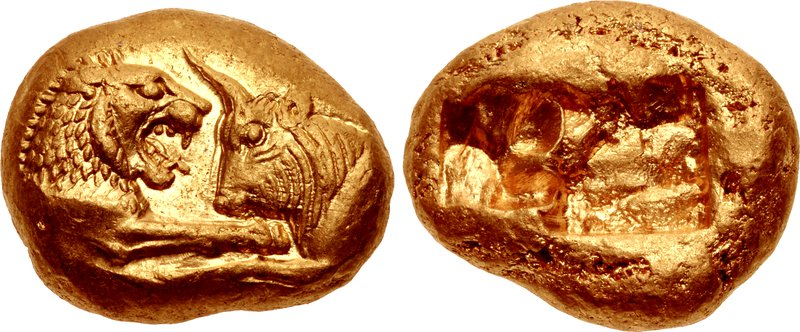
Gold Croeseid, circa 561-546 BC. Heavy series: 10.76 grams, Sardes mint.

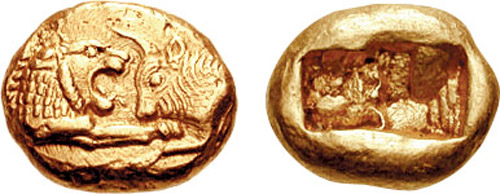
Gold Croeseid, circa 550 BC. Light series: 8.07 grams, Sardes mint.

The Croeseid, anciently Kroiseioi stateres, was a type of coin, either in gold or silver, which was minted in Sardis by King Croesus of Lydia (561–546 BC) from around 550 BC. Croesus is credited with issuing the first true gold coins with a standardised purity for general circulation, and the world's first bimetallic monetary system.

== Precedents ==
Before Croesus, his father Alyattes had already started to mint various types of non-standardized coins. They were made in a naturally occurring material called electrum, a variable mix of gold and silver (with about 54% gold and 44% silver), and were in use in Lydia, its capital city Sardis and surrounding areas for about 80 years before Croesus' reign as King of Lydia. The unpredictability of electrum coins' composition implied that they had a variable value, which greatly hampered the development of standardised coinage. The royal symbol stamped on the coin, similar to a seal, was a declaration of the value of the contents in gold, silver or electrum.

Herodotus mentioned the innovation of coinage, and standard coinage, made by the Lydians:

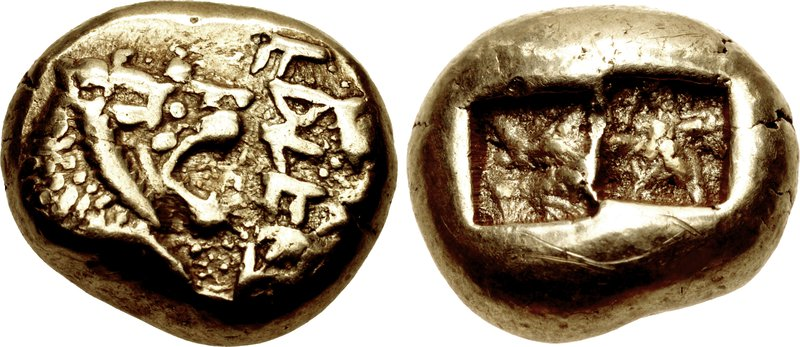
Coin of Alyattes in electrum, 620-563 BC. Legend Walwel ("Alyattes") in Lydian script.

So far as we have any knowledge, they [the Lydians] were the first people to introduce the use of gold and silver coins, and the first who sold goods by retail.

— Herodotus, I.94

== Characteristics ==
Croeseids

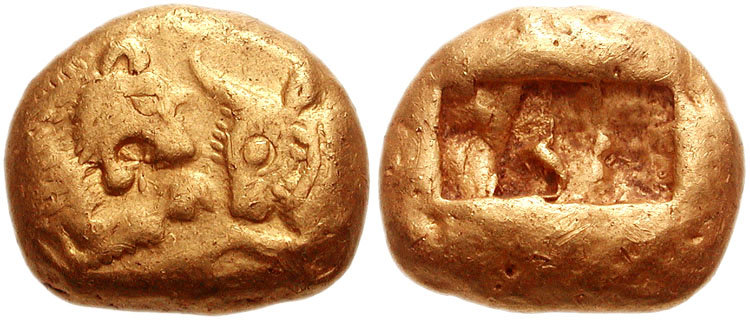
Gold Croeseid, minted by King Croesus c. 561-546 BC. (10.7 grams, Sardis mint).

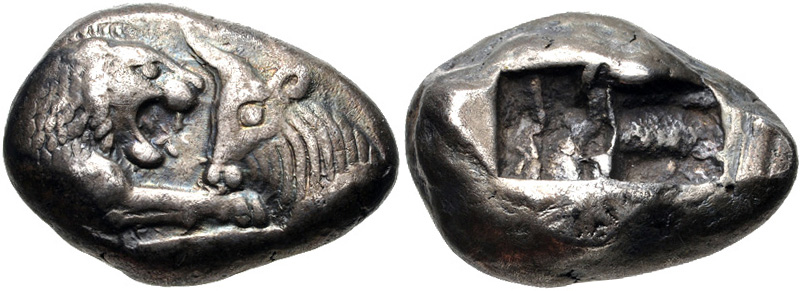
Silver Croeseid, minted by King Croesus, circa 560-546 BC (10.7 grams, Sardis mint)

The gold and silver Croeseids formed the world's first bimetallic monetary system circa 550 BC.

Croesus replaced all the electrum coins by gold and silver coins using a single coin type: the facing foreparts of a lion and a bull. Compared to later copies made by the Achaemenids, the original Croeseid use a more natural rendering of the two animals. The reverse was struck with two incuse squares. The coins were minted in Sardis. The gold and the silver were refined in Sardis from raw electrum in workshops in Sardis. Recent archaeological excavations have shown stratigraphically that the first Croeseids were indeed issued by Croesus before the Achaemenid invasion, and not after the Achaemenid as has sometimes been suggested.

The gold coins had an initial weight of 10.7 grams. The silver coins also were issued in 10.7 grams, together with many smaller denominations, from 1/3 to 1/48. This makes it the world's first bimetallic monetary system though the idea of smaller silver denominations had originated in Cyme (Aeolis) under Hermodike II.

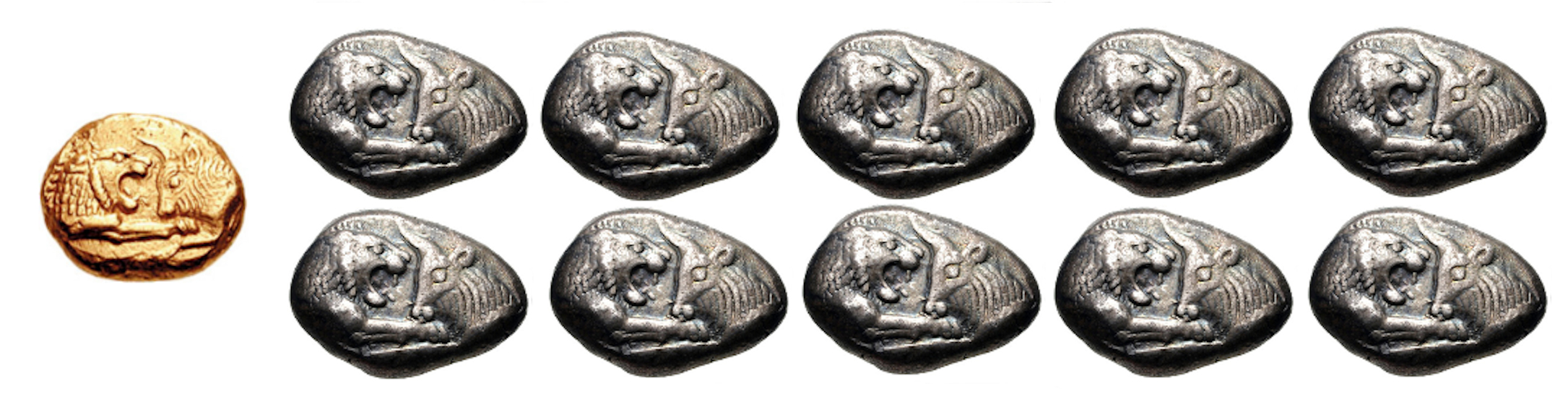
Croeseid bimetallic equivalence: 1 gold Croeseid of 8.1 grams was equivalent in value to 10 silver Croeseids of 10.7 grams.

The Croeseids were minted in Sardis, Lydia (modern Turkey).

Soon after however, the gold coins were struck in a lighter standard of 8.1 grams. The modification of the weight may have been the result of a policy to exchange and remove all electrum coins in circulation with the heavier format, the 10.7 grams corresponding to the nominal weight of gold in a standard 14.1 grams electrum stater (about 70%). Once this was done the coins were lightened to 8.1 grams corresponding to the true weight of gold in the electrum coins, which had often been voluntarily debased. Reducing the weight of the gold stater to 8.1 grams also allowed to simplify the exchange mechanism between gold and silver, as now 1 gold stater of 8.1 grams corresponded precisely in value to 10 silver staters of 10.7 grams, or to 20 silver coins of 5.35 grams (weight of the future Achaemenid Siglos), since the current exchange rate on a weight basis was 1 to 13.3 at the time.

The great advantage of the Croeseids compared to their electrum predecessors is that they were very reliable: the pure gold and pure silver coins all had a clear intrinsic value, entirely guaranteed by their purity and clearly defined by their weight, which, as an added benefit, was standard. On the contrary, the actual composition of various electrum coins was very hard to determine, so that the true intrinsic value of each coin could not be easily estimated. The royal symbol, or stamp, created by Aylettes asserted that the coins had a specified value. These were not token coins as we use today since the value is in the metal rather than merely decreed by the state.

=== Symbolism ===
The lion attacking the bull motif on this coin type has been variously theorized as symbolizing the sun and moon, spring and winter (the fall of the constellation Taurus corresponded to the date of the spring sowing), strength and fertility, Asia Minor and Europe, and Lydia and its neighbor Phrygia.

Alternatively, the lion - symbol of Lydia - and the bull - symbol of Hellenic Zeus (from the Seduction of Europa) - are facing each other in truce; Note that hunting lions attack from the rear, also imagery of a predator and prey lying down together in peace is reflected in other ancient literature, e.g. "...the calf and the lion and the yearling together..." c.700BC. In the historical context of Lydia's alliance with Agamemnon of Cyme, an arrangement sealed by the marriage of Greek Hermodike II, possibly Croesus’ mother, to his father, Alyettes (AKA a later Midas). However, any peace between Lydians and Greeks is not to be confused with Croesus’ attempted conquest of Miletus. Notwithstanding, the croeseid symbolism of peace between the Greeks of Asia Minor, Lydians and later Persians persisted long after Croesus’ death - until Darius the Great introduced new coins c.500BC.

== Achaemenid Croeseids ==
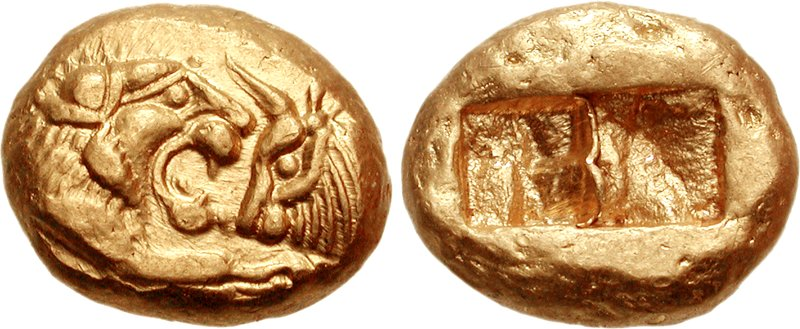
Achaemenid Croeseid, time of Cyrus the Great to Darius I. Circa 545–520 BC. Weight: 8.06g, Sardis mint. The design of the animals is more rigid than the original Lydian issues.

When the Achaemenid Empire ruler Cyrus the Great invaded Lydia, together with the rest of Asia Minor, he adopted the bimetallic system initially introduced by Croesus, and continued to strike gold and silver coins at Sardis according to the model of the Croeseid until around 520 BC. The design of the animals though was more rigid, less natural, than the original Lydian issues.

These coins were found in very fresh condition in the Apadana hoard, coins deposited under the foundation stone of the Apadana in Persepolis, dated to circa 515 BC, confirming that they had been recently minted under Achaemenid rule. The deposit did not have any Daric and Sigloi, which also suggests strongly that these Achaemenid coins only started to be minted later, after the foundation of the Apadana Palace.

== Replacement of the Croeseids by Achaemenid coinage ==
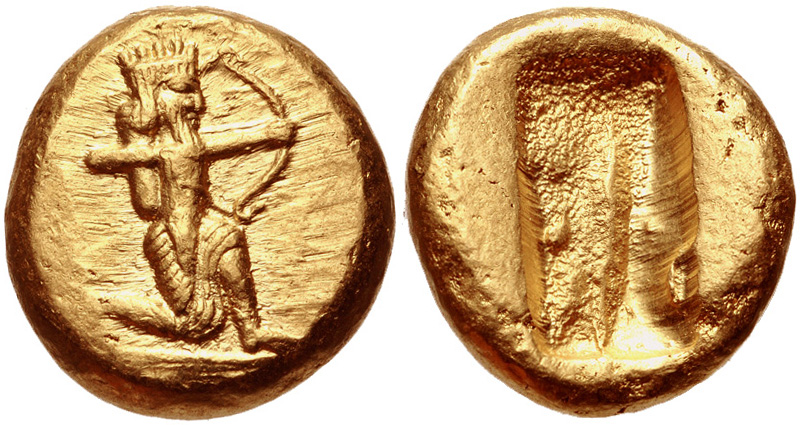
Type II Daric ("King shooting arrow") temp. Darios I to Xerxes I. Circa 505-480 BC. There are no Type I coins known in Darics (only in Sigloi).

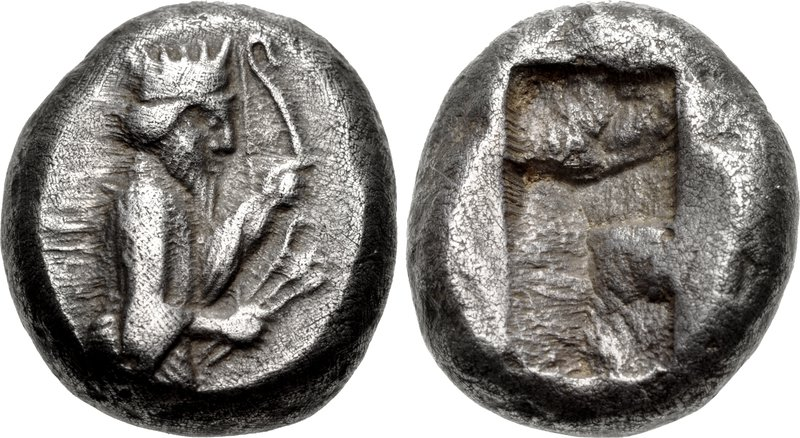
The first type of Siglos (Type I: "King with bow and arrows", upper body of the king only), from the time of Darius I. Circa 520-505 BC

Under Darius I, the minting of Croeseid in Sardis was then replaced by the minting of Darics and Sigloi, probably around 515 BC. The earliest gold coin of the Achaemenid Empire, the Daric, followed the weight standard of the Croeseid, and is therefore considered to be later and derived from the Croeseid. The weight of the Daric would then be modified through a metrological reform, probably under Darius I.

Sardis remained the central mint for the Persian Darics and Sigloi of Achaemenid coinage, and there is no evidence of other mints for the new Achaemenid coins during the whole time of the Achaemenid Empire. Although the gold Daric became an international currency which was found throughout the Ancient world, the circulation of the silver Sigloi remained very much limited to Asia Minor: important hoards of Sigloi are only found in these areas, and finds of Sigloi beyond are always very limited and marginal compared to Greek coins, even in Achaemenid territories.
