= Apadana hoard =

Hoard of coins from Persepolis

Apadana hoard

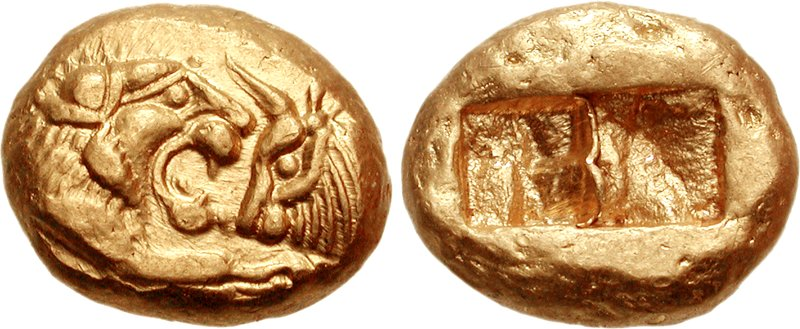
Gold Croeseid minted in the time of Darius, of the type of the eight Croeseids found in the Apadana hoard, circa 545-520 BCE. Light series: 8.07 grams, Sardis mint.

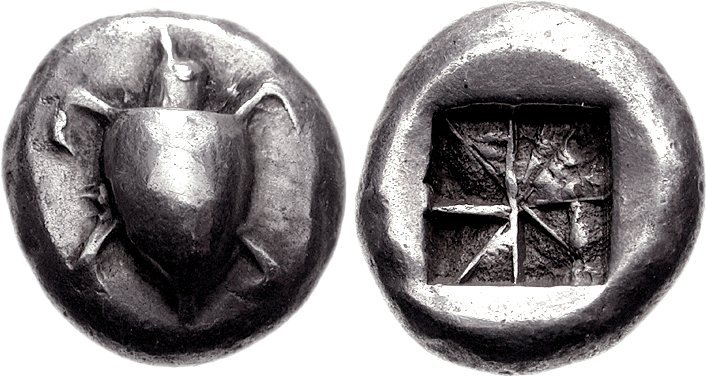
Type of the Aegina stater found in the Apadana hoard, 550–530 BCE. Obv: Sea turtle with large pellets down centre. Rev: incuse square punch with eight sections.

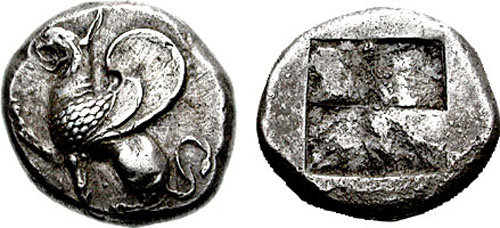
Type of the Abdera coin found in the Apadana hoard, circa 540/35-520/15 BCE. Obv: Griffin seated left, raising paw. Rev: Quadripartite incuse square.

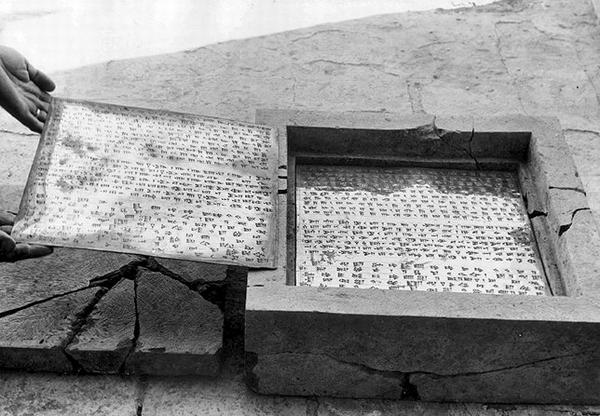
One of the stone boxes with the foundation tablets of Darius I, under which the coins had been deposited.

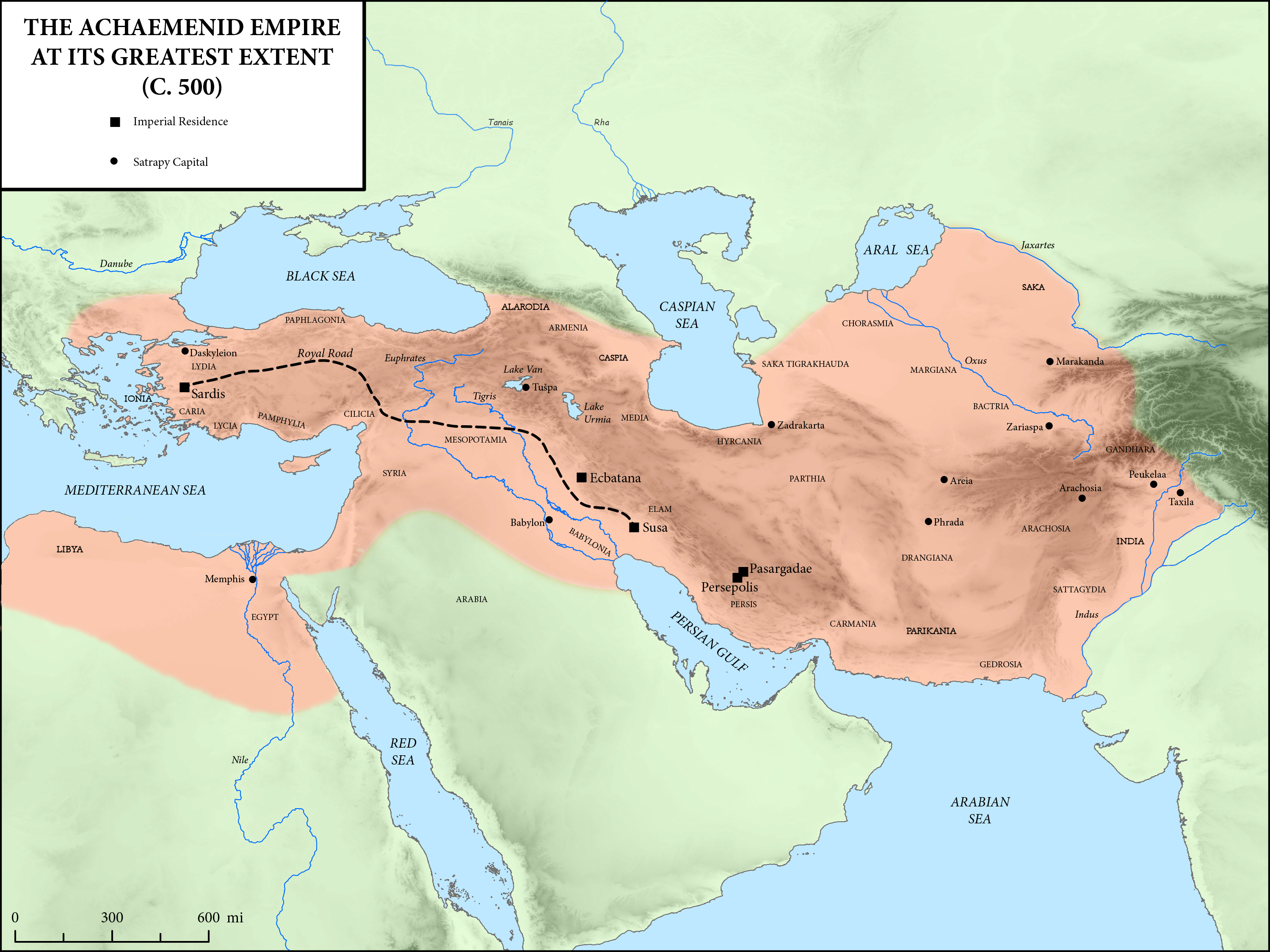
The Achaemenid Empire at its greatest extent.

The Apadana hoard is a hoard of coins that were discovered under the stone boxes containing the foundation tablets of the Apadana Palace in Persepolis. The coins were discovered in excavations in 1933 by Erich Schmidt, in two deposits, each deposit under the two deposition boxes that were found. The deposition of this hoard, which was visibly part of the foundation ritual of the Apadana, is dated to circa 515 BCE.

== Foundation tablets ==
The gold and silver tablets retrieved from the stone boxes contained a trilingual inscription by Darius in Old Persian, Elamite and Akkadian, which describes his Empire in broad geographical terms, and is known as the DPh inscription:

Darius the great king, king of kings, king of countries, son of Hystaspes, an Achaemenid. King Darius says: This is the kingdom which I hold, from the Sacae who are beyond Sogdia to Kush, and from Sind (Old Persian: 𐏃𐎡𐎭𐎢𐎺, "Hidauv", locative of "Hiduš") to Lydia (Old Persian: "Spardâ") - [this is] what Ahuramazda, the greatest of gods, bestowed upon me. May Ahuramazda protect me and my royal house!

— DPh inscription of Darius I

== Foundation hoard ==
The coins found in the hoard were:

- Northeastern deposit: Four gold lightweight Croeseids (Sardis mint), a tetradrachm of Abdera, a stater of Aegina.
- Southeastern deposit: Four gold lightweight Croeseids (Sardis mint), three double-sigloi from Cyprus (one attributed to Lapethus, one to Paphos, and one to an uncertain mint).

The Croesids were found in very fresh condition, confirming that they had been recently minted under Achaemenid rule. The deposit did not have any Darics and Sigloi, which also suggests strongly that these coins typical of Achaemenid coinage only started to be minted later, after 515 BCE.

=== Symbolism ===
According to numismatist Martin Price, the coins in the hoard were probably selected not for the location they represented, but for the symbolic significance of their type. The lion attacking the bull in the Lycian coinage of the Croeseids had obvious symbolism for the Achaemenids, the griffin on the coin of Abdera may have been used as the symbolic guardian of gold, and the turtle of the coin from Aegina may have been chosen as a symbol of maritime power.

=== Other coin types of the Apadana hoard ===
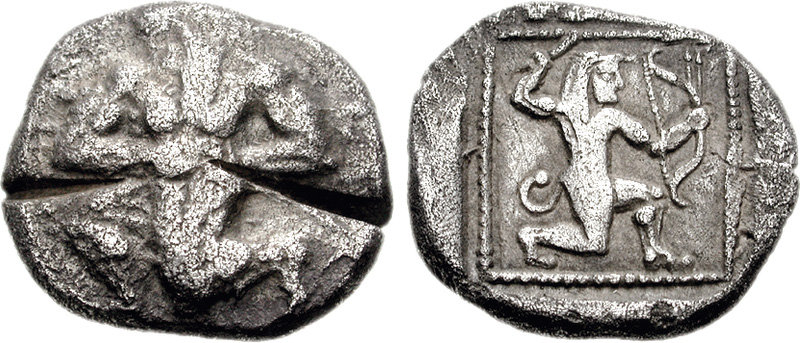
Coin type of the Cyprus double Siglos from Lapethus found later near the hoard. Late 6th-early 5th century BCE

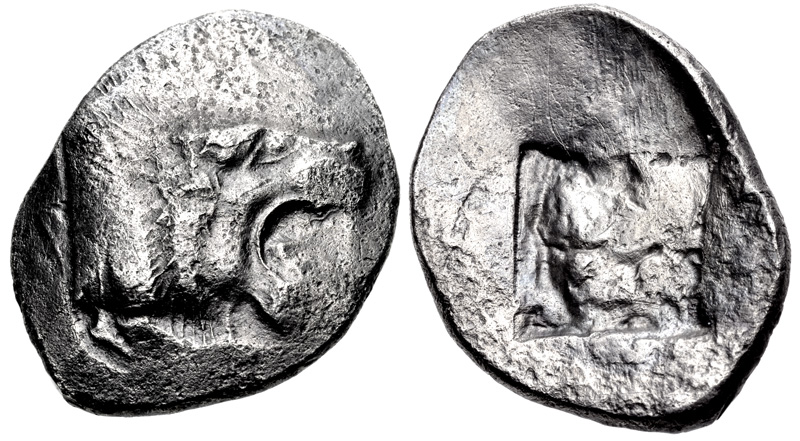
Coin similar to the type of a Cyprus coin from an uncertain mint, found in the hoard. 5th century BCE

== See also ==
- Ancient Greek coinage
- Achaemenid coinage
- Kabul hoard
- Ghazzat hoard
