= Limping bimetallism =

Monetary system in the United States

Limping bimetallism was a monetary system in the United States that was dependent partially on silver but primarily on gold. It was developed after the abandonment of bimetallism and the adoption of the gold standard in 1873. The Bland–Allison Act of 1878 allowed the coining of new silver dollars, thus creating this system. Contrary to popular belief, the limping standard was not abandoned upon enactment of the Gold Standard Act of 1900.
