= Achaemenid coinage =

Aspect of Iranian history

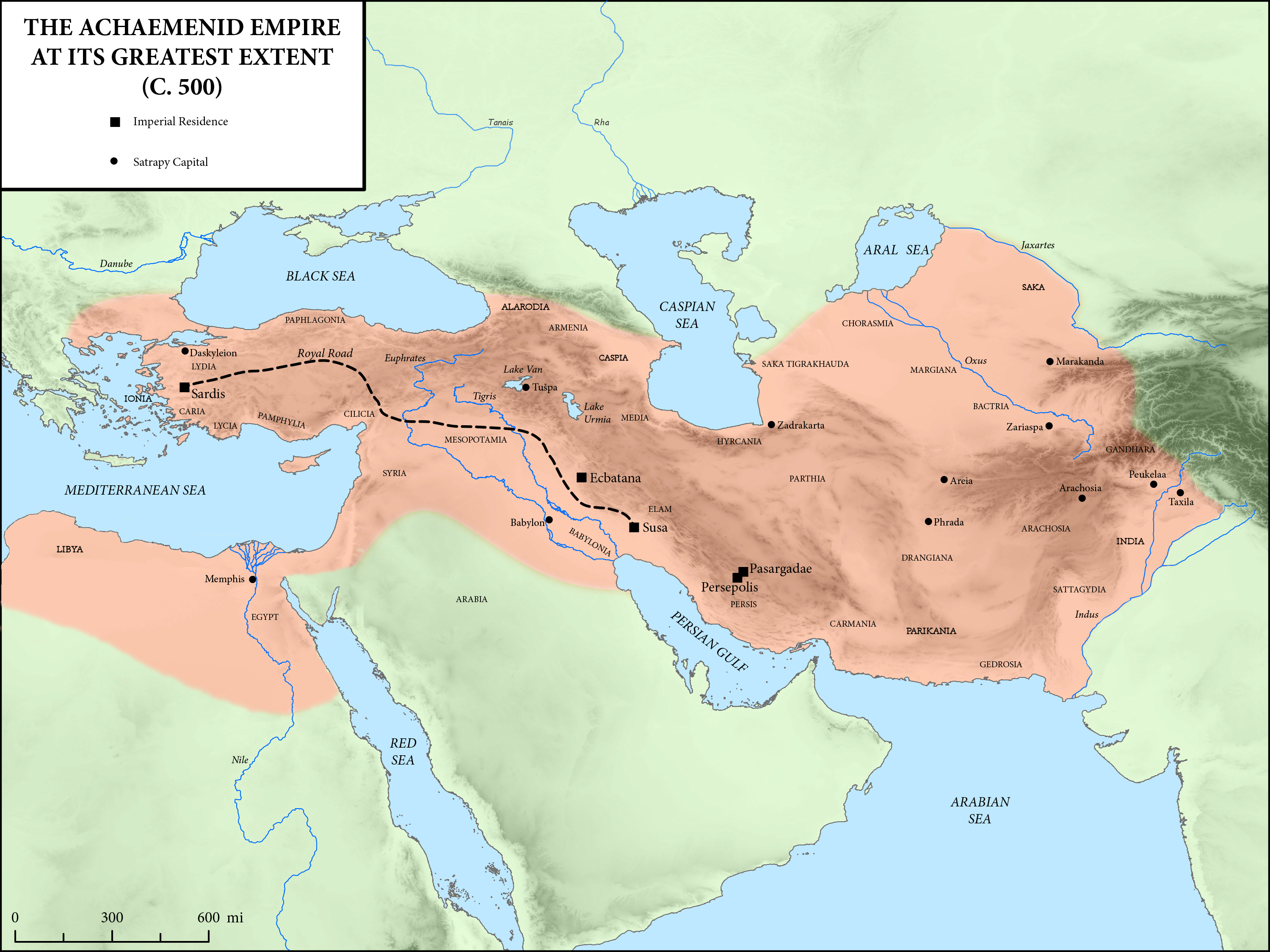
The Achaemenid Empire at its greatest extent

The Achaemenid Empire issued coins from 520 BCE–450 BCE to 330 BCE. The Persian daric was the first gold coin which, along with a similar silver coin, the siglos (from Ancient Greek: σίγλος, Hebrew: שֶׁקֶל, shékel) represented the first bimetallic monetary standard. It seems that before the Persians issued their own coinage, a continuation of Lydian coinage under Persian rule is likely. Achaemenid coinage includes the official imperial issues (Darics and Sigloi), as well as coins issued by the Achaemenid provincial governors (satraps), such as those stationed in Asia Minor.

== Early coinage of Western Asia under the Achaemenid Empire ==
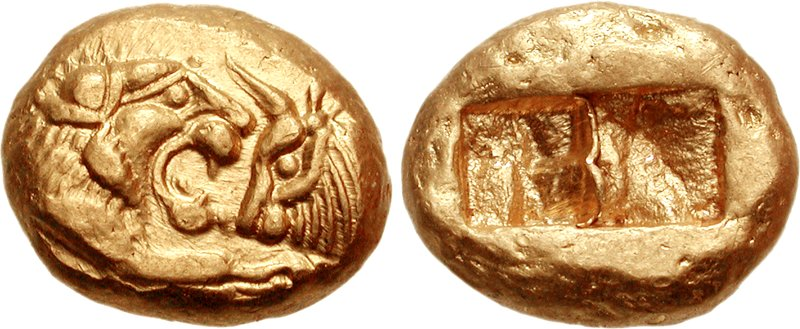
Coin type of Croesus, the Croeseid, minted in Lydia, under the rule of Cyrus the Great to Darius I. Circa 545–520. It only weighs 8.06 g, compared to the standard 10.7 grams of the Croeseid.

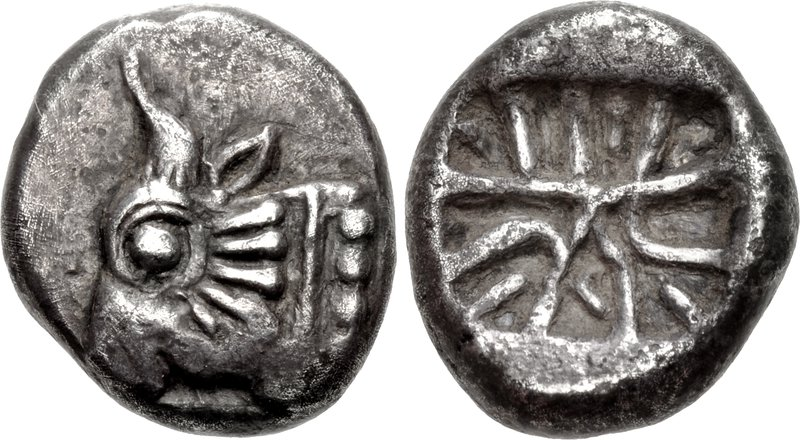
Lycia coin, with obverse bull protome and reverse incuse punch mark using a geometrical motif, circa 520–470

When Cyrus the Great (550–530) came to power, coinage was unfamiliar in his realm. Barter, and to some extent silver bullion, was used instead for trade. The practice of using silver bars for currency also seems to have been current in Central Asia from the 6th century.

Cyrus the Great introduced coins to the Persian Empire after 546 BCE, following his conquest of Lydia and the defeat of its king Croesus, whose father Alyattes had put in place the first coinage in history. With his conquest of Lydia, Cyrus acquired a region in which coinage was invented, developed through advanced metallurgy, and had already been in circulation for about 50 years, making the Lydian Kingdom one of the leading trade powers of the time.

It seems that Cyrus initially adopted the Lydian coinage as such, and continued to strike Lydia's lion-and-bull Croeseid coinage. The stater coins had a weight of 10.7 grams, a standard initially created by Croesus, which was then adopted by the Persians and became commonly known as the "Persic standard". The Persians also minted posthumous Croeseid half-staters, with a weight of 5.35 g, which would become the weight standard for the later Sigloi, introduced at the end of the 6th century.

Soon after 546, Cyrus also had full control of Asia Minor, including other regions such Lycia, Caria or Ionia, following the conquests of his general Harpagus. With the conquest of Lydia and the adoption of Lydian coinage, the nascent Achaemenid Empire thus obtained access to the most modern coinage of its time and the economic power that goes with it. The mint was located in Sardis, now capital of all the western satrapies of the Achaemenid Empire, and continued minted operation under Cyrus. This coinage would supply the western part of the Achaemenid Empire.

Technically, these early coins used incuse punches on the reverse, while the obverse die would consist in some pictorial design ("die and punch" technique, rather than the later "two dies" technique). The Lydian coins used double punches on the reverse, a technique which would be simplified in the time of Darius by using a single reverse punch on some coinage. Some of the earliest Lycian coins under the Achaemenids also used an animal design on the obverse and incuse punches on the reverse, which developed into geometrical forms, such as two diagonals between projecting rectangular lugs.

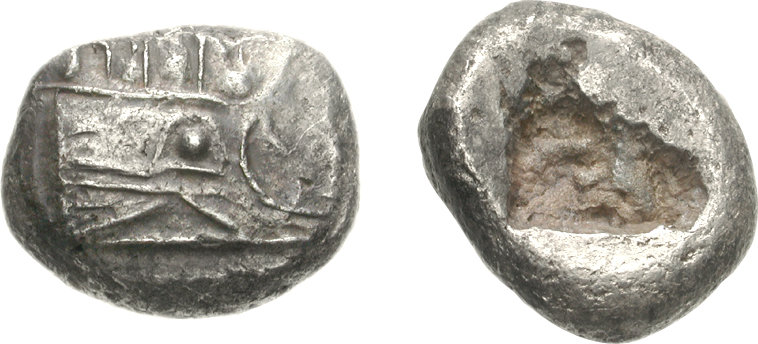
Coin of Phaselis, Lycia. Circa 550–530/20

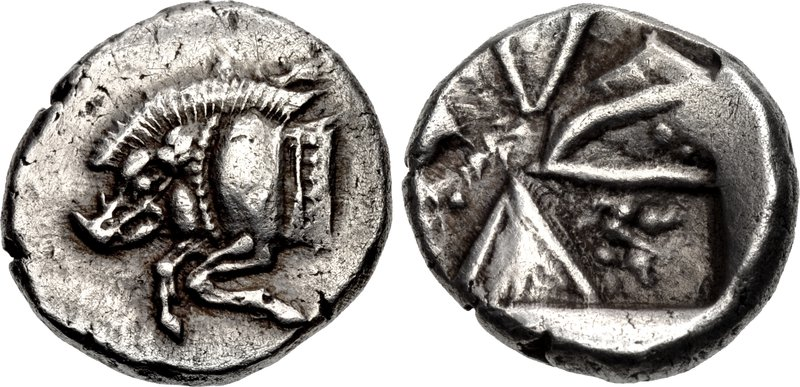
Coin of Lycia. Circa 520–470/60

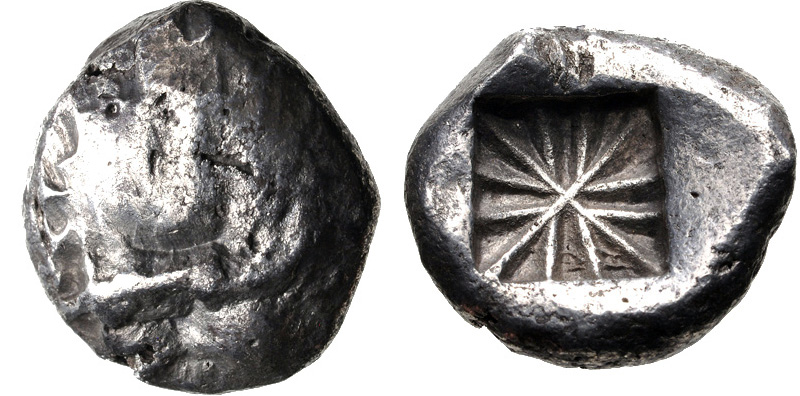
Lycia coin. Circa 520–470. Struck with worn obverse die

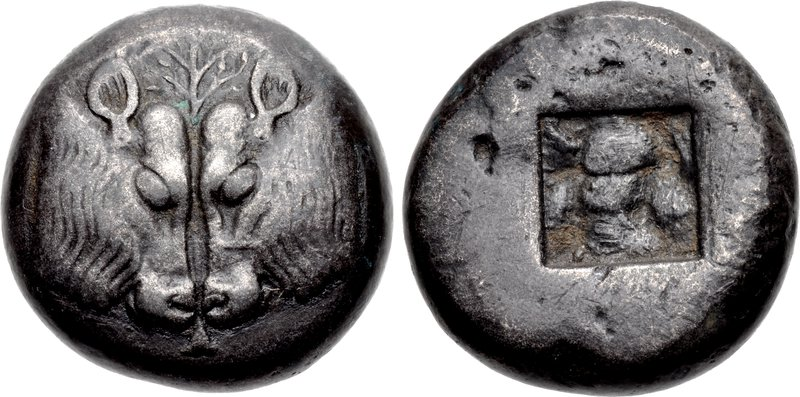
Coin of Lesbos, Ionia. Circa 510–480

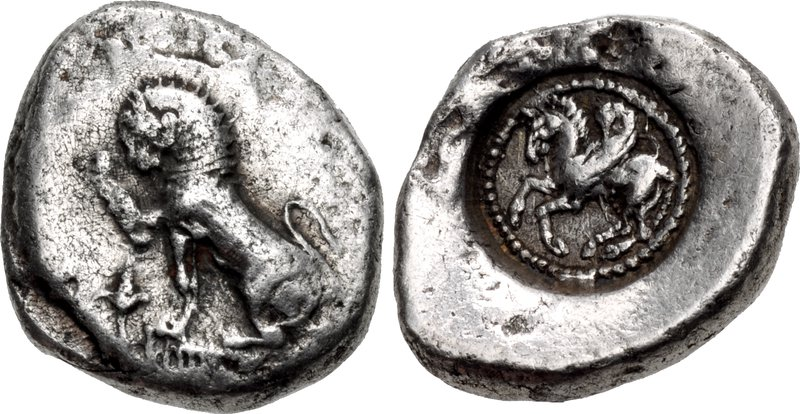
Lycia coin, with lion and Pegasus in circle, circa 480–460

=== Apadana hoard (c.515 BCE) ===
Coin types of the Apadana hoard

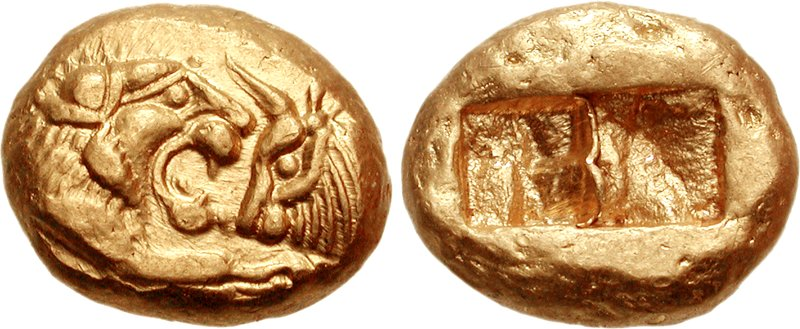
Gold Croeseids

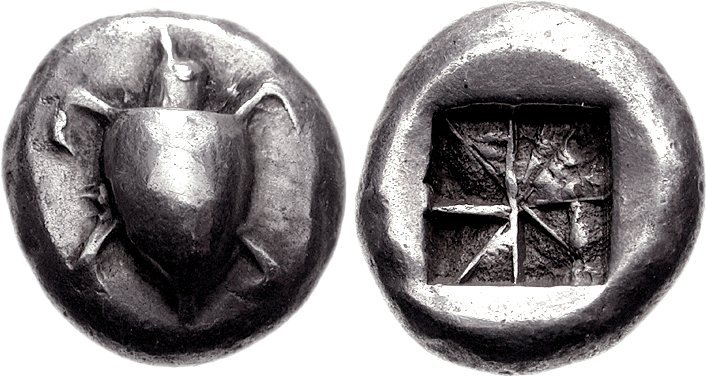
Aegina stater

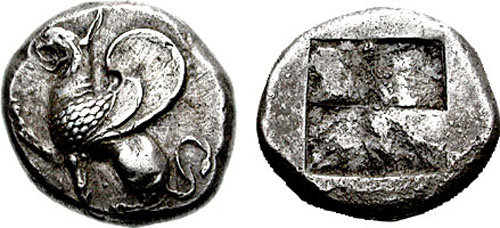
Abdera coin

As late as the time of the foundation of the Apadana Palace in Persepolis (dated to between 519 and 510), it seems that the Achaemenids had not yet designed the Sigloi and Darics: no coins of these types were found in the Apadana hoard discovered under the palace's foundation stones, whereas the hoard contained several gold Croeseids of the light type from Sardis (probably minted under the rule of Darius I) and several imported Archaic Greek silver staters.

== Darics and Sigloi ==
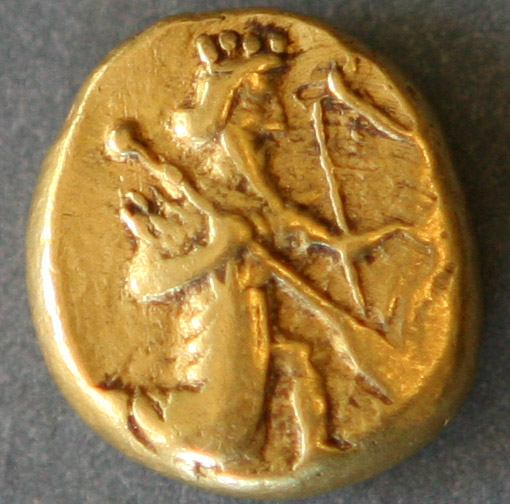
Daric gold coin (circa 490)

The coinage of the Achaemenid Empire started to move away from simply copying Lydian coinage, to introducing changes with the reign of Darius I (ruled 522–486). Under Darius I, the minting of Croeseids in Sardis was progressively replaced by the minting of Darics and Sigloi.

From around 510–500, Darius then simplified the coining procedure by replacing the double reverse punch of Lydian coins, by a single, oblong reverse punch, and he introduced the image of the Persian king in place of the lion and bull design. This is deduced from the fact that no Darics or Sigloi were found in the Apadana hoard, under the Apadana foundation stones of the Apadana Palace in Persepolis (dated to between 519 and 510), whereas there were gold Croeseids of the light type and Greek silver staters. But by around 500 BCE, a clay tablet, issued in year 22 of the reign of Darius I, contained the impression on clay of two Type II Sigloi ("King shooting arrow"), showing that the new Sigloi had already been issued by that date. Because of these and other discoveries, the creation of the Darics and Sigloi is dated to the last decade of the 6th century, during the reign of Darius I.

The new Achaemenid coins were initially only made in silver, while the Lydian gold design of the Croesus was maintained. Then Darius introduced his new design for gold coins as well, which came to be known as Darics, from Old Persian Daruiyaka, meaning "Golden". Although the Achaemenids had developed their own currency, they still accepted local monetary production including civic issues, throughout the land under their control, in particular in Western Asia.

According to numismatist Martin Price, there is no doubt that the Darics and Sigloi of Types I and II were minted at Sardis and immediately followed the production of the Croeseids, since they adopted similar weights and were of the same fabric. He insists that the finds of the Croeseids and the "Archer" types of Darics and Sigloi indicate that they were not an Imperial coinage, but rather the coinage of the Satrapy of Lydia.

Minting activity

Throughout the period of the Achaemenid Empire, it seems the Darics and Sigloi were exclusively minted in Sardis, Lydia (modern Turkey), where they replaced the original production of the Croeseids.

Although the Achaemenids fully exploited and developed coinage production in Western Asia, it seems barter economy remained quite important in the Iranian heartland throughout the Achaemenid period, and the Achaemenids did not develop their own mints in Iran. At the same time, the circulation of the Daric was mainly confined to the Western part of the Achaemenid Empire. The minting of coins in Iran would only start later from circa 330 BCE under Alexander the Great and the Seleucid Empire.

It seems that all the minting activity for the Darics and the Sigloi for the whole Empire was essentially centralized in one mint, or possibly two mints, at Sardis in Lydia. Sardis remained the central mint for the Persian Darics and Sigloi of Achaemenid coinage, and there is no evidence of other mints for the new Achaemenid coins during the whole time of the Achaemenid Empire. According to hoard finds, Sardis was clearly the main mint, but there may also have been secondary mints in southwestern and northwestern Asia Minor as well.

Overall, it seems that the minting of Darics and Sigloi was rather small in quantity compared to the other local productions of coins in Asia Minor, or the circulation of Greek coins in the area. Although the gold Daric became an international currency which was found throughout the Ancient world, the circulation of the silver Sigloi remained very much limited to Asia Minor: important hoards of Sigloi are only found in these areas, and finds of Sigloi beyond are always very limited and marginal compared to Greek coins, even in Achaemenid territories.

Standards

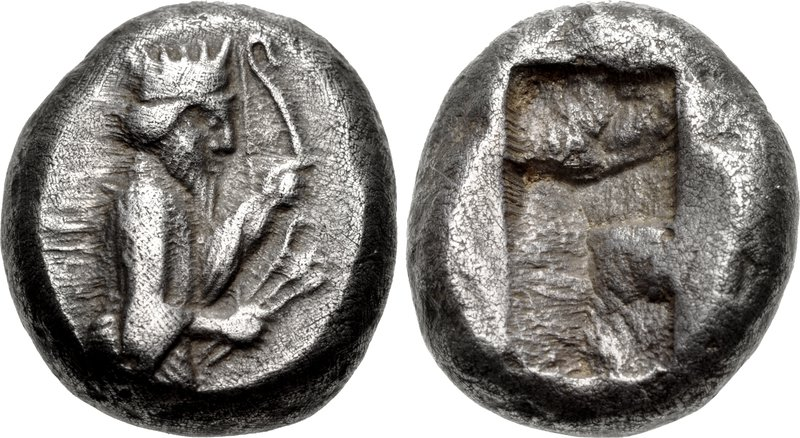
The first type of Siglos (Type I: "King with bow and arrows", upper body of the king only), from the time of Darius I. Circa 520–505

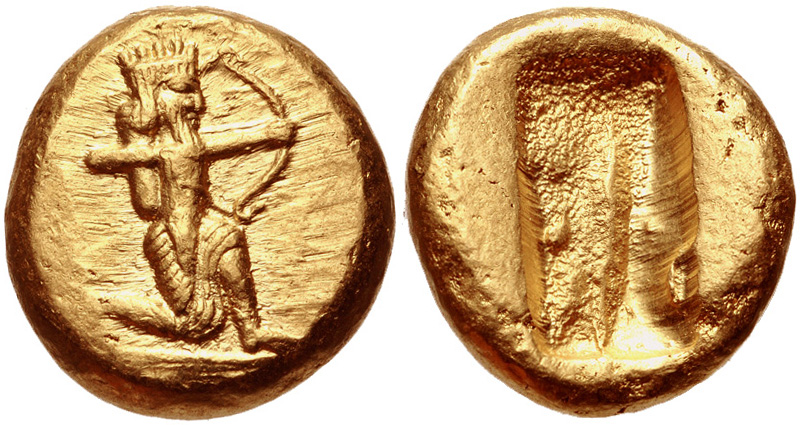
Type II Daric ("King shooting arrow") temp. Darios I to Xerxes I. Circa 505–480. There are no Type I coins known in Darics (only in Sigloi).

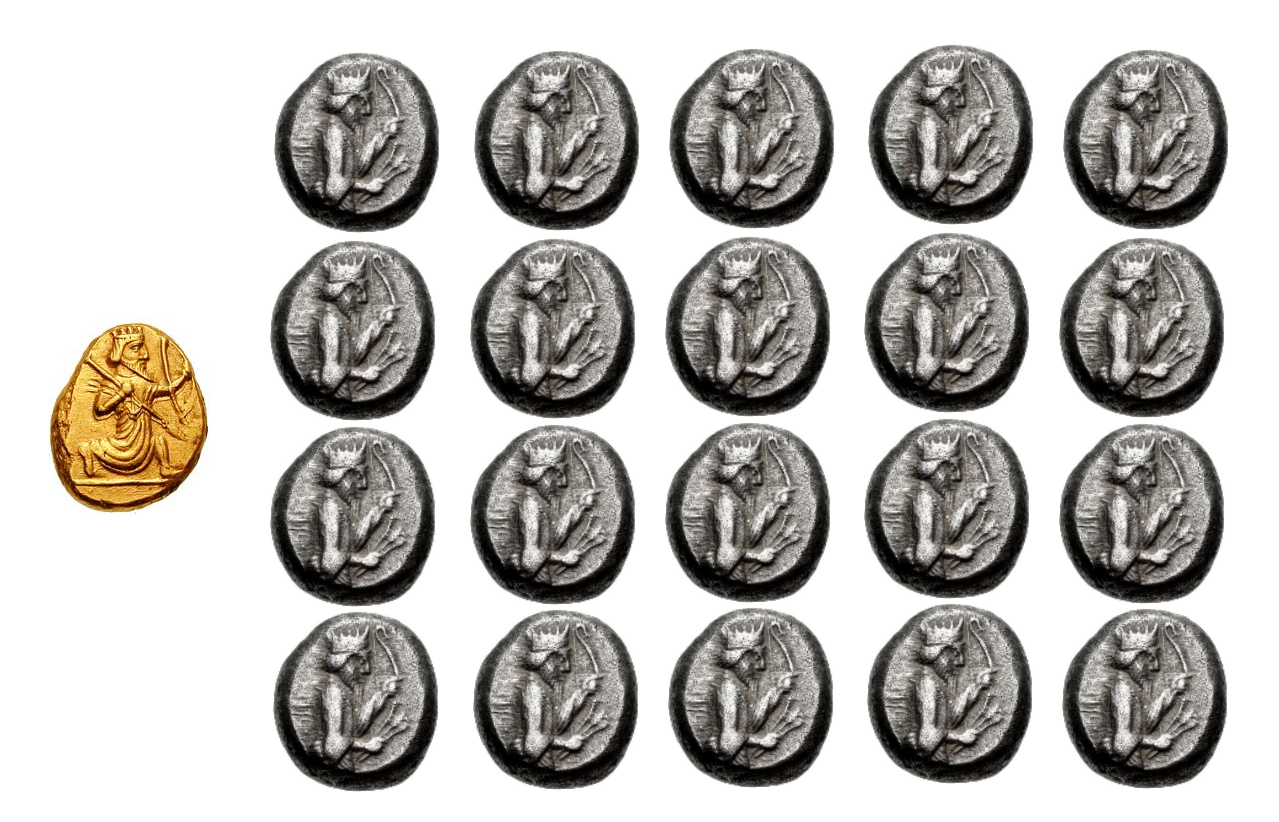
Achaemenid bimetallic equivalence: 1 gold Daric was equivalent in value to 20 silver Sigloi. Under the Achaemenids the exchange rate in weight between gold and silver was 1 to 13.

Darius introduced the reformed currency system from about 510–500, consisting of gold Darics and silver Sigloi. The rate of exchange was 1 Daric = 20 Siglos. A Daric was between 8.10 and 8.50 grams in weight, based on the Babylonian shekel of 8.33 grams, slightly heavier than the Croesus standard of 8.06 grams. The purity of gold was between 98 and 99%. 1 Daric = 25 Attic Drachmae. It represented initially about 1 month of a soldier's wage. This new coin became popular throughout all of the ancient world for more than 150 years. Around 395 BCE, the Achaemenids, led by Satrap Pharnabazes, bribed Greek states by paying them tens of thousands of Darics in order to attack Sparta, which was then waging a campaign of destruction in Asia Minor under Agesilaus II. This started the Corinthian War. According to Plutarch, Agesilaus, the Spartan king, said upon leaving Asia "I have been driven out by 10,000 Persian archers", a reference to "Archers" (Toxotai) the Greek nickname for the Darics from their obverse design, because that much money had been paid to politicians in Athens and Thebes in order to start a war against Sparta.

The Siglos was 5.40-5.60 grams each, based on the 0.5 Lydian Siglos of 10.73-10.92 grams for the full unit. Purity was at first issue 97-98% but by the middle 4th century was 94-95%. 1 Siglos = 7.5 Attic Obols.

Although the area of Babylon had never minted Darics or Sigloi, after the capture of Babylon by Alexander, the Satrap Mazaeus, reconfirmed by Alexander in his position for having opened the doors of Babylon to his armies after the Battle of Gaugamela, issued the double Daric of 16.65 grams in weight whose image was based on the Daric coin and bore his name until his death in 328.

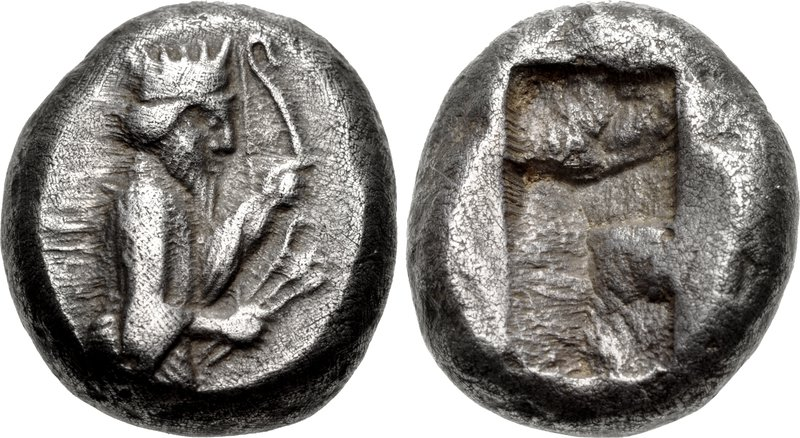
Siglos Type I ("King with bow and arrows"), from the time of Darius I. Circa 520–505

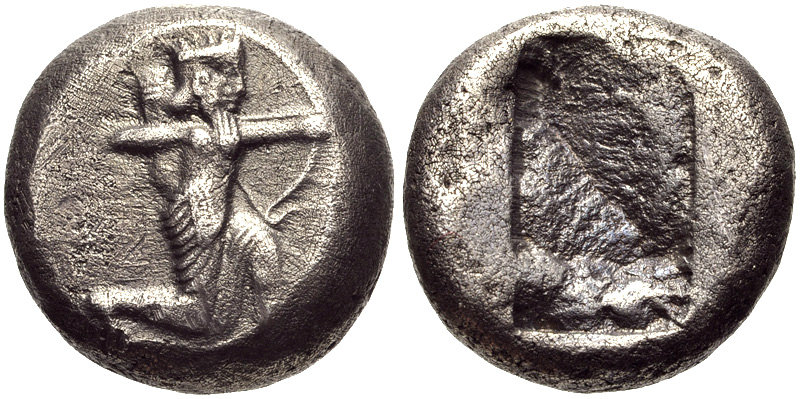
Siglos Type II ("King shooting arrow"), time of Darius I to Xerxes I, circa 505–480

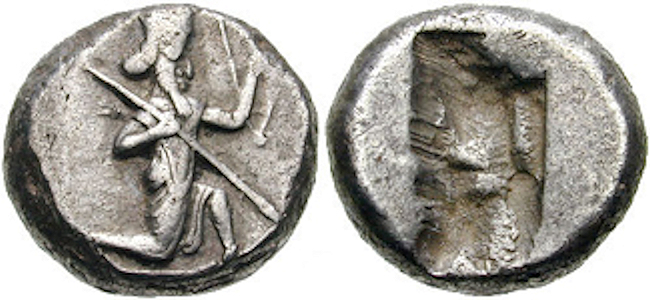
Siglos Type III ("King running with lance"), from the time of Xerxes and after.

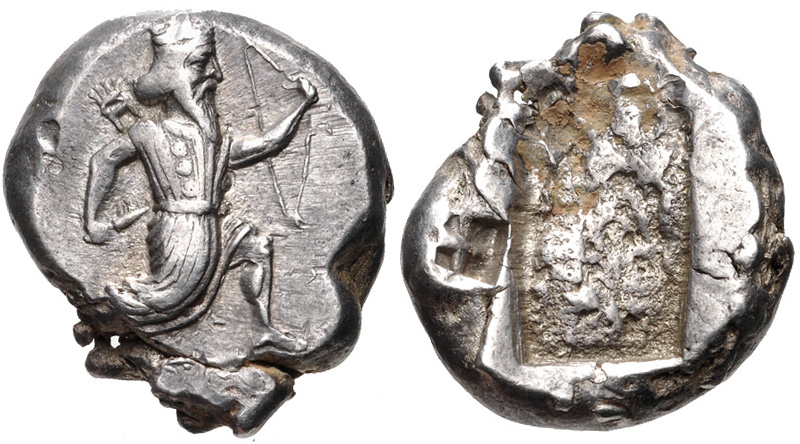
Siglos Type IV ("King running with dagger"), temp. Artaxerxes II to Artaxerxes III, circa 375–340
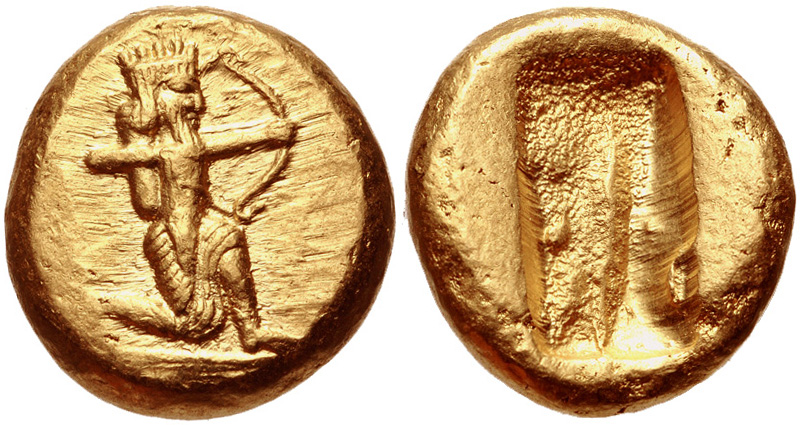
Type II Daric ("King shooting arrow") temp. Darios I to Xerxes I. Circa 505–480.

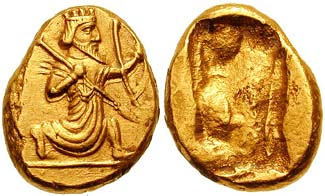
Daric Type III ("King running with lance") gold coin (mid-4th century)

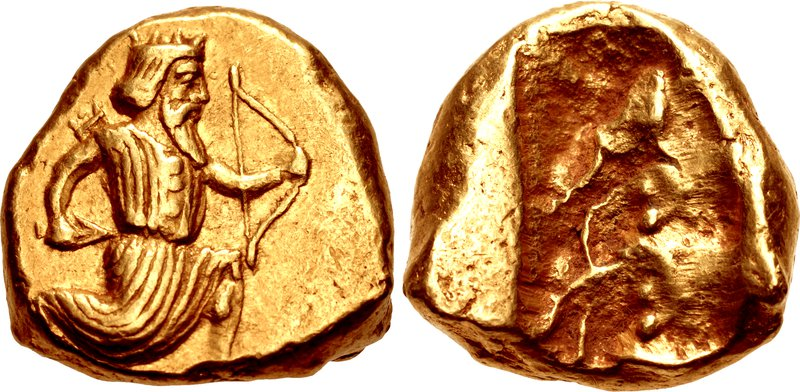
Daric Type IV ("King running with dagger"), temp. Artaxerxes II to Artaxerxes III, circa 375–340. (15 mm, 8.33 g)

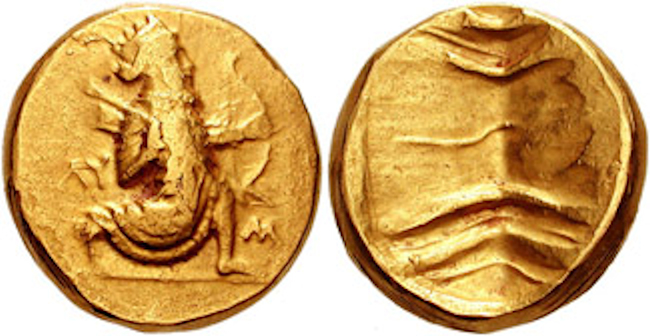
Double Daric minted, well after the conquests of Alexander the Great, in Babylon circa 322–315.

Design

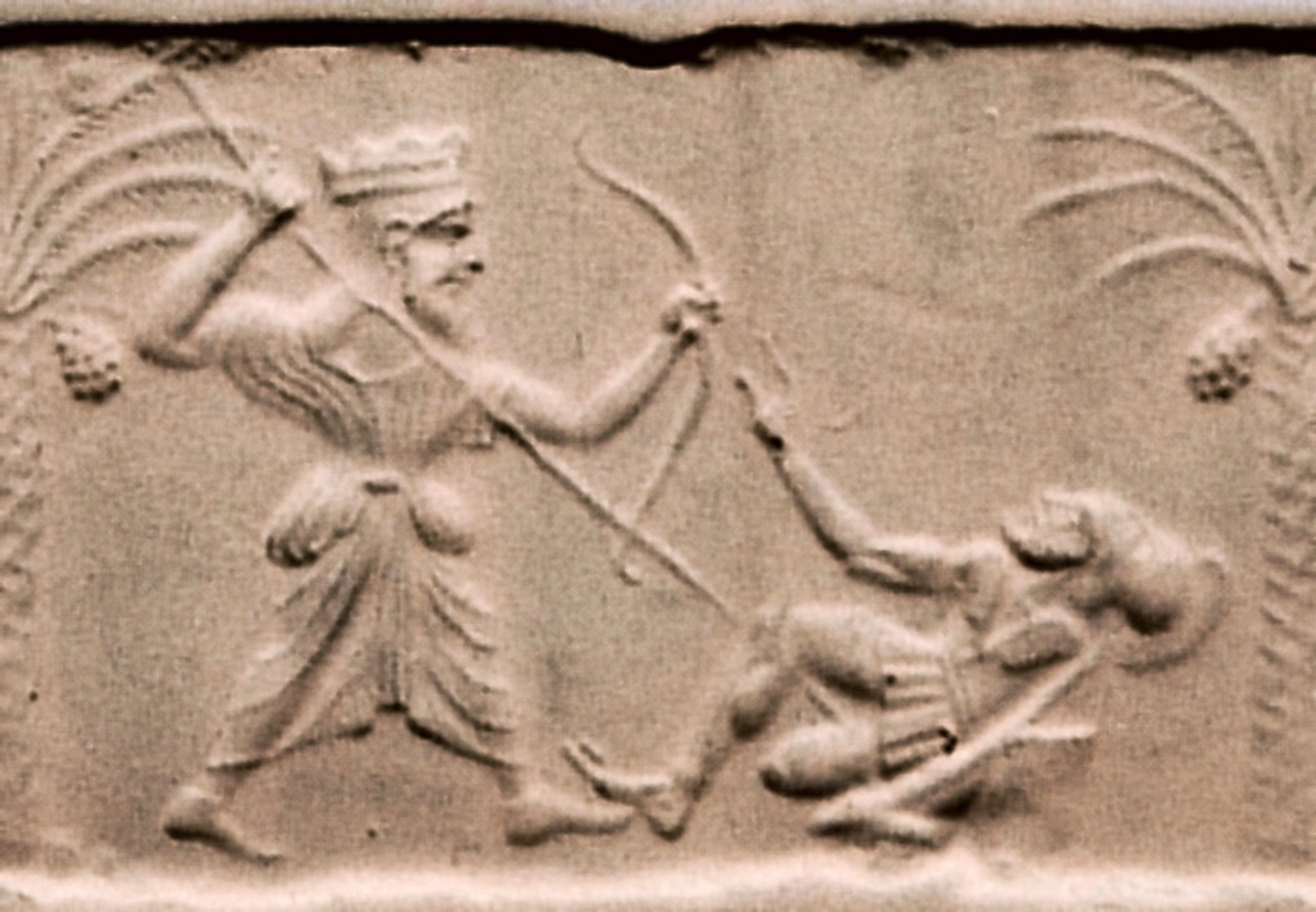
Contemporary depiction of an Achaemenid king, here killing a Greek hoplite. Impression of a cylinder seal, engraved circa 500–475, at the time of Xerxes I. Metropolitan Museum of Art.

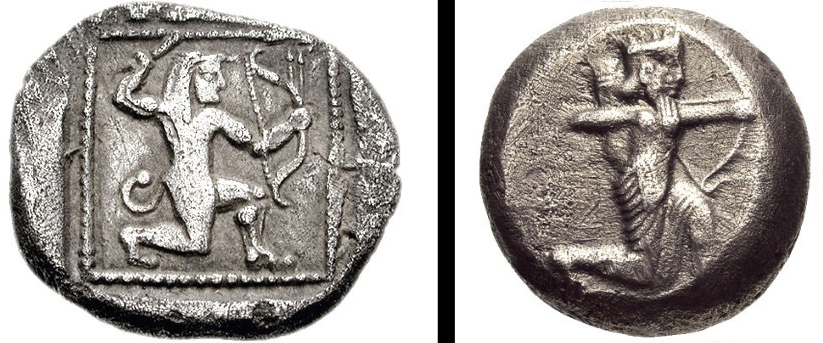
Archer type of Herakles on a late-6th- to early-5th-century coin of Cyprus (Apadana hoard, left), and archer type on an Achaemenid Type II Siglos (right).

The "archer" type used in Achaemenid coinage may have been derived from similar and contemporary images on Greek coinage, in particular those of Herakles shooting arrows. The adaptation of this design for the illustration of the Achaemenid king or hero on the obverse may have been meant as a way to glorify the king, in way a which was easily understandable to the Hellenized people in the Western areas of the Achaemenid Empire, who minted the Achaemenid coinage and to whom this coinage was mainly destined as a currency. Other depictions of the king as an archer (for example shooting from his chariot) are also known from Sumerian art, so this representation would also have been natural to subjects in the Achaemenid realm as well. The "archer" type of Type II, less hieratic and rigid than the traditional Achaemenid illustration of the bust of the king on Type I, may represent the fusion of the Eastern conception of the King as a royal hunter, and the Western conception of the King as a hero, and designed to represent the Achaemenid king as an Olympian contestant in a propaganda effort towards the West. These depictions also imply that the Achaemenids were the first ever to illustrate the person of their king on coinage.

Extent

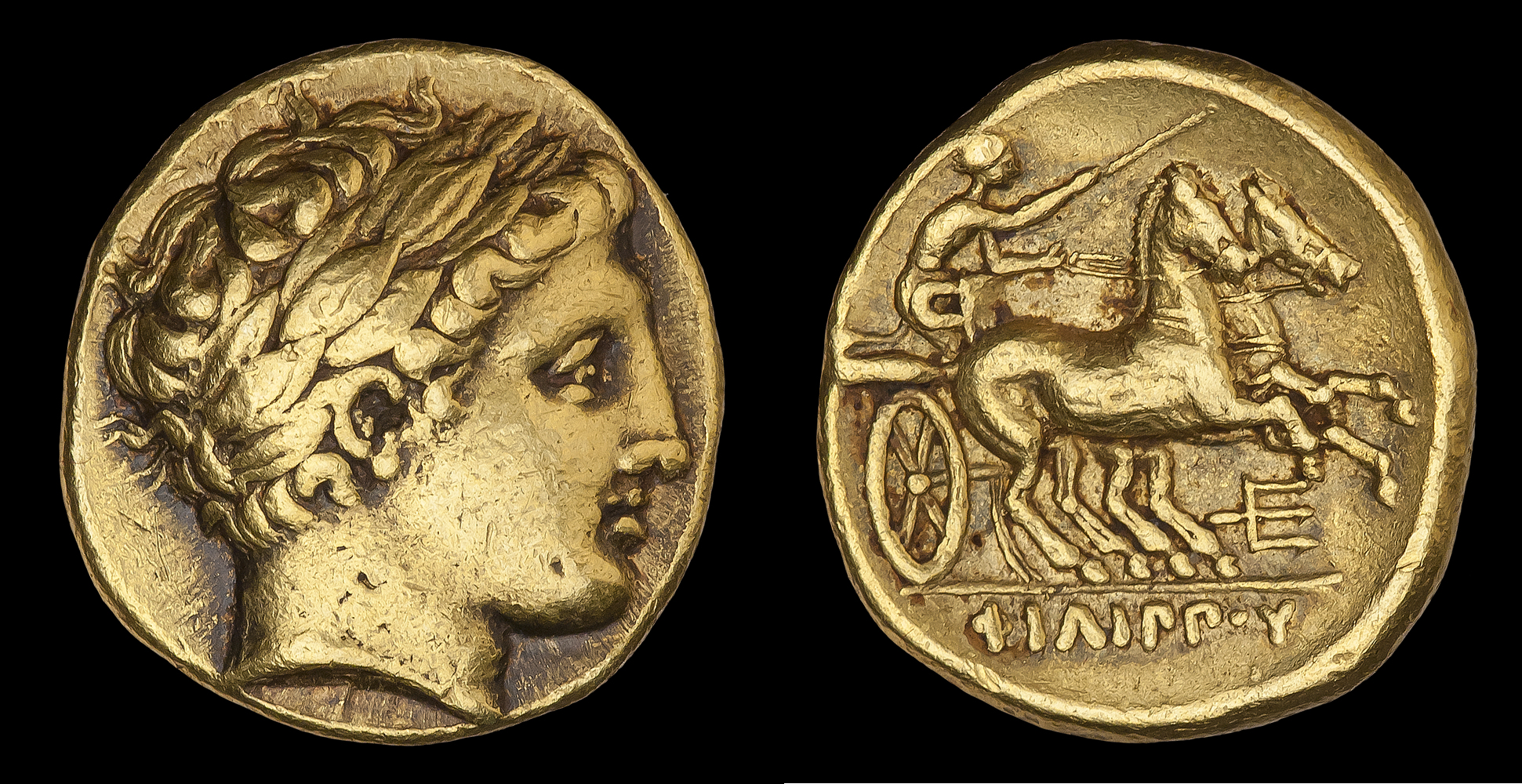
The gold Stater of Philip II of Macedon was the first true competition for the Achaemenid Daric. It was called Dareikos Philippeios ("Philip's Daric") by the Greeks

In effect, the gold Daric became a currency desired in all the ancient world, since it was the most convenient format to exchange and accumulate wealth. The Greeks never minted much gold, but their silver Athenian tetradrachms also became a sort of world currency from the 5th century. The first important competition against the prestigious Daric, as a means of storing wealth and making large payments on an international scale, came later from Philip II of Macedon (ruled 359–336), when he issued his own gold coinage, pointedly called Dareikos Philippeios by the Greeks.

Archaeological finds

Daric coins have been found in Asia Minor, Greece, Macedonia and Italy. The Siglos denomination have been found in hoards only in Asia Minor and single coins with other Greek coinage from Ancient Egypt to Afghanistan (Kabul hoard) and Pakistan (Shaikhan Dehri hoard). A single Siglos coin, minted in Salamis, Cyprus was found at the shore of Ashdod, Israel in 2026.

== Circulation of Greek coinage throughout the Empire ==
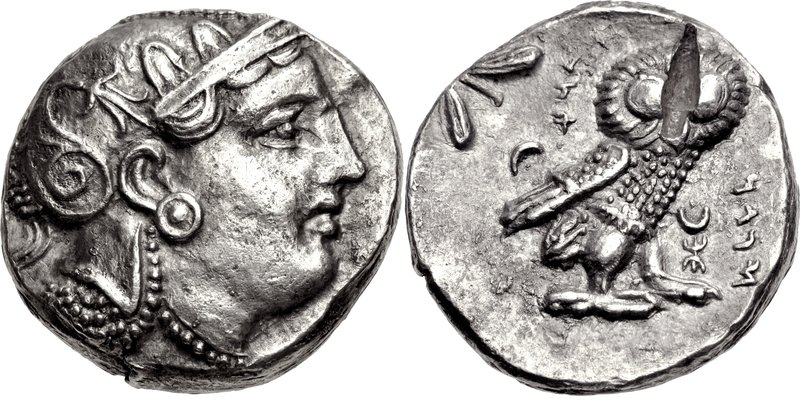
Coin of the Achaemenid satrap of Egypt Sabakes, in imitation of the Athenian tetradrachm. Circa 340-333. Achaemenid Egypt.

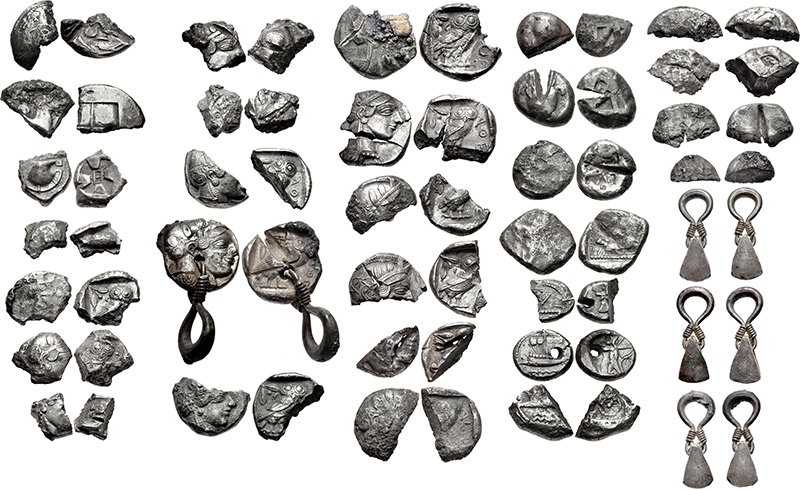
Eastern hacksilber from the Achaemenid Levant, including jewelry and Greek coins, 425–420

In all the known hoards of the Achaemenid period, royal Achaemenid coinage, such as the sigloi, form actually a small minority, while most of the non-local coinage generally comes from the Greek realm, either from the independent Greek mainland or from the Greek colonies of Western Asia under the Achaemenid rule. For example, the Kabul hoard, in modern-day Afghanistan, included 30 coins from various Greek cities, about 33 Athenian coins and an Iranian imitation of an Athenian coin, only 9 royal Achaemenid silver coins (sigloi). There were also 29 locally minted coins and 14 punch-marked coins in the shape of bent bars.

Some Achaemenid satraps are also known to have minted coins in imitation of Athenian coinage, such as the satrap of Egypt Sabakes (ruled circa 340–333). An Achaemenid copy of an Athenian coin, this time found in the Kabul hoard, was minted in the vicinity of Babylon circa 380.

The fact that Greek coins (both Archaic and early Classical) are comparatively numerous in Achaemenid period coin hoards, much more numerous than sigloi, suggests that the circulation of Greek coinage was central in the monetary system of the Empire. These coins were probably not legal tenders in the Achaemenid Empire, but were valued for their weight in silver, and thus used as bullion silver. Numerous finds of hacksilber hoards in the East also exist from the period, in which various silver objects, including coins, are cut into pieces, in order to facilitate their exchange on the basis of their weight.

Greek coinage travelled throughout the Achaemenid Empire. For example, the Greek coins discovered in the Kabul hoard include the following types:

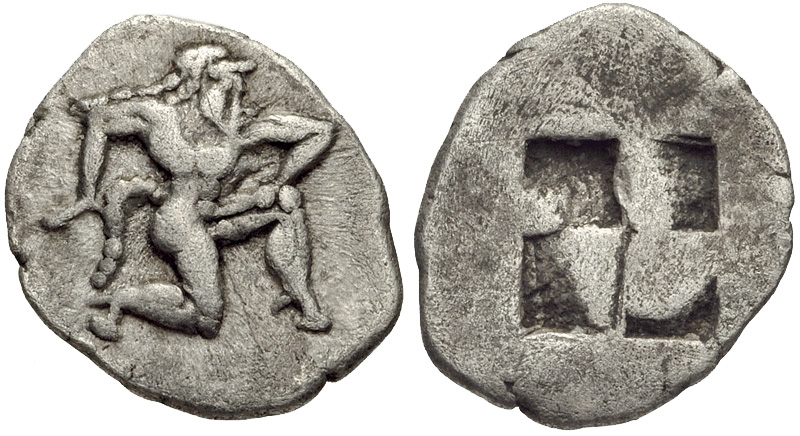
Archaic coin of Thasos, circa 500-463.

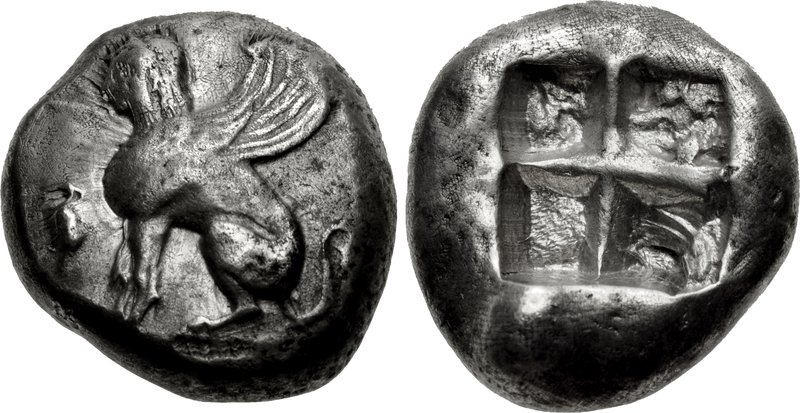
Archaic coin of Chios, circa 490–435. Earlier types known.

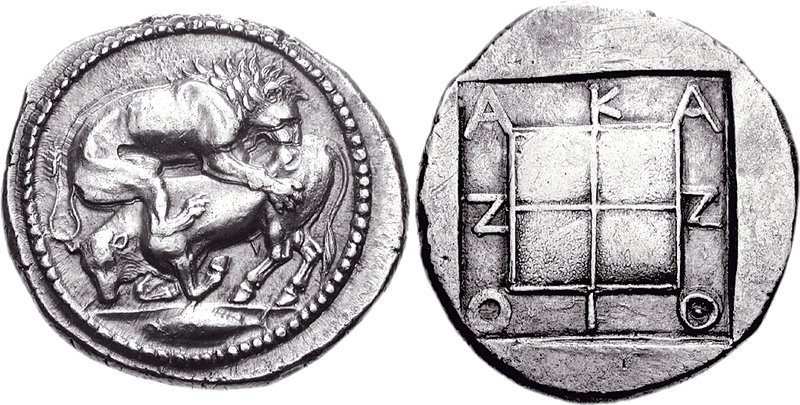
Coin of Akanthos, Macedon. Circa 470–430.

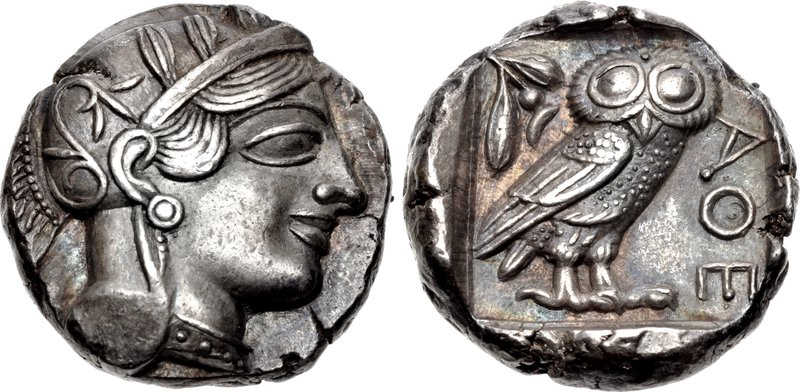
Early Classical coins from Athens were by far the most numerous coin type in the Kabul hoard. Circa 454–404.

== Coinage of Southern Asia under the Achaemenid Empire ==
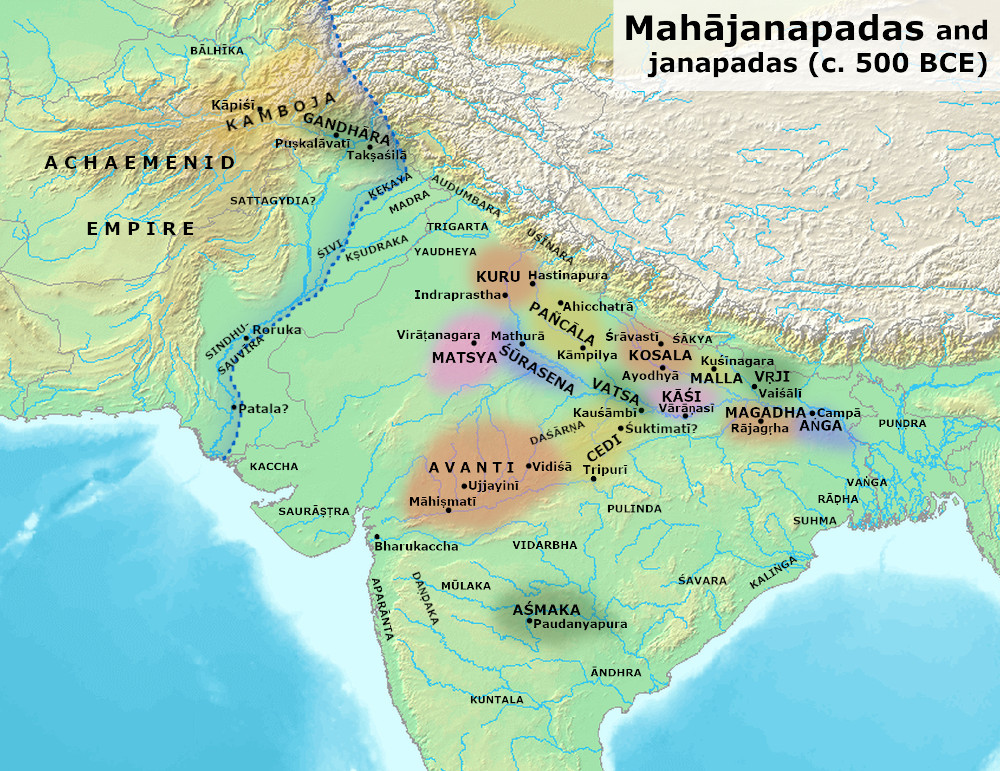
Eastern border of the Achaemenid Empire and ancient kingdoms and cities of ancient India (circa 500 BCE).

The Achaemenid Empire already reached the doors of India during the original expansion of Cyrus the Great, and the Achaemenid conquest of the Indus Valley is dated to circa 515 under Darius I. An Achaemenid administration was established in the area. The Kabul hoard, also called the Chaman Hazouri hoard, is a coin hoard discovered in the vicinity of Kabul, Afghanistan, containing numerous Achaemenid coins as well as many Greek coins from the 5th and 4th centuries. The deposit of the hoard is dated to the Achaemenid period, in approximately 380 BCE. The hoard also contained many locally produced silver coins, minted by local authorities under Achaemenid rule. Several of these issues follow the "western designs" of the facing bull heads, a stag, or Persian column capitals on the obverse, and incuse punch on the reverse.

According to numismatist Joe Cribb, these finds suggest that the idea of coinage and the use of punch-marked techniques was introduced to India from the Achaemenid Empire during the 4th century. More Achaemenid coins were also found in Pushkalavati and in Bhir Mound.

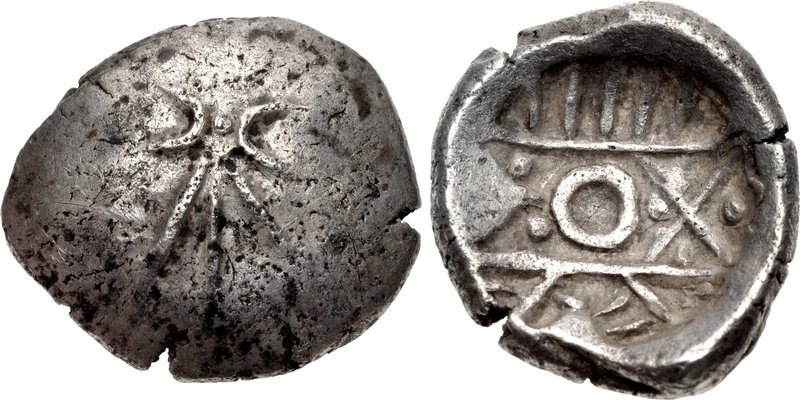
Punch-marked coin minted in the Kabul Valley under Achaemenid administration. Circa 500–380, or c.350.

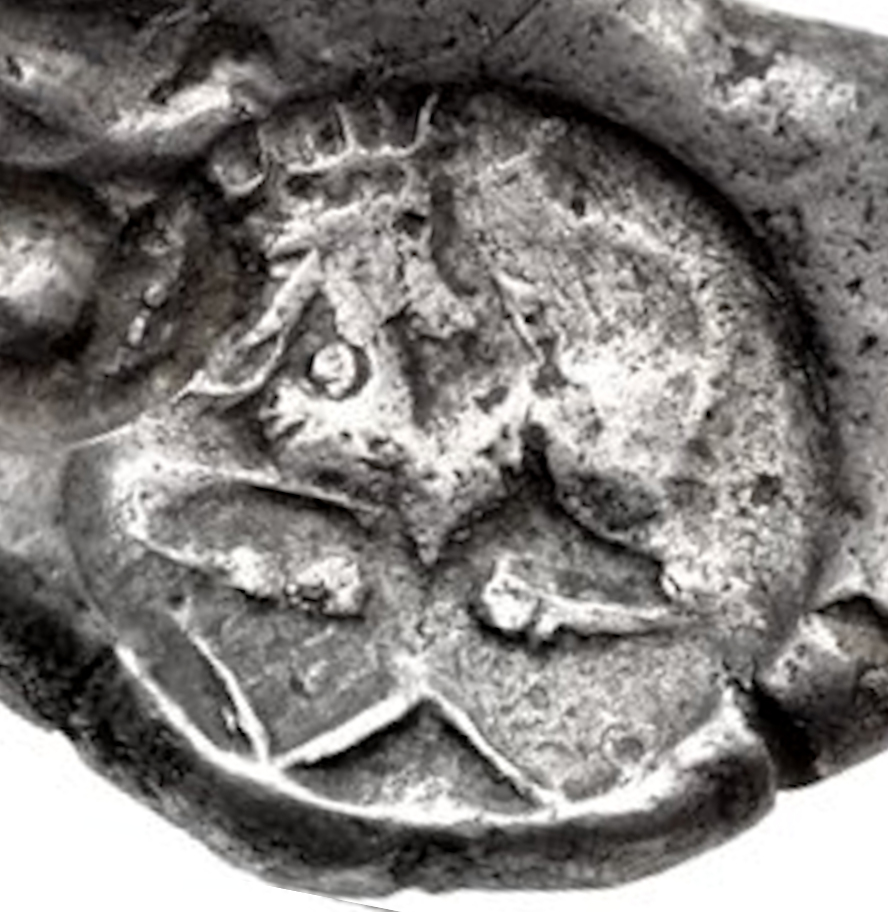
A siglos found in the Kabul valley, 5th century. Coins of this type were also found in the Bhir Mound hoard.

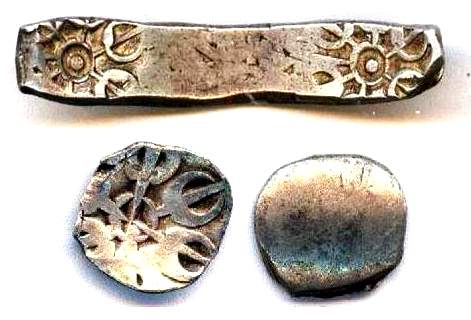
Early punch-marked coins of Gandhara. Taxila-Gandhara region.

== Later Satrapal issues ==
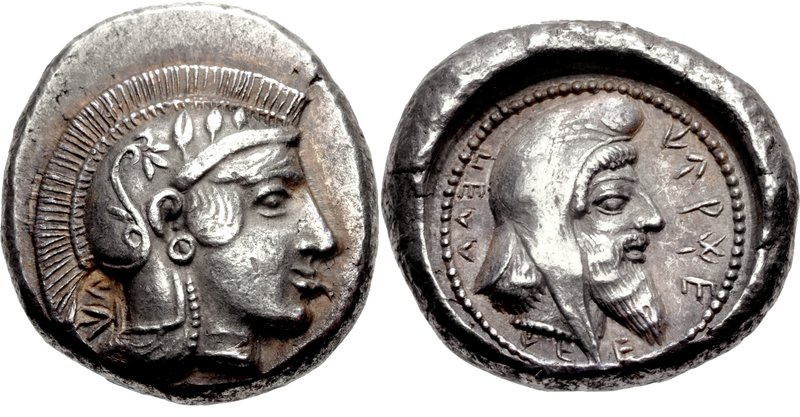
Coin of the Achaemenid dynast of Lycia, Kherei, with Athena on the obverse, and himself wearing the Persian cap on the reverse. Circa 440/30–410

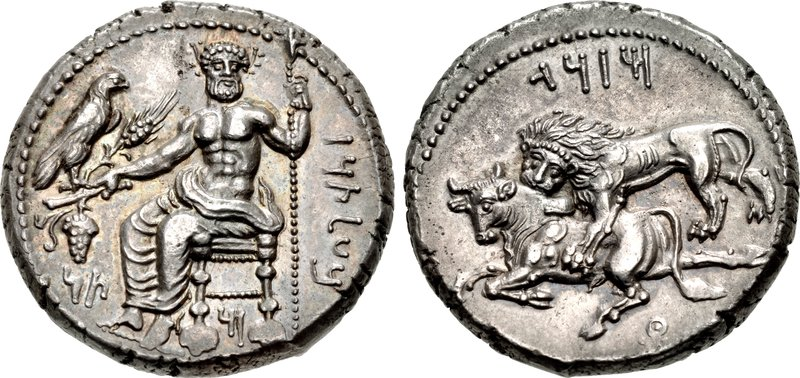
Coin of Mazaios. Satrap of Cilicia, 361/0–334. Tarsos, Cilicia

During the 4th century, following the weakening of central Achaemenid power, and the development of coinage technologies, Siglos production receded and numerous satrapal issues of a very high quality started to appear in Western Asia under the Achaemenid Empire. These issues combined Achaemenid as well as Greek characteristics. Throughout, coin circulation was characterized by a mix of coins from the Achaemenid and Greek realms.

Various Achaemenid satraps also issued imitations of Athenian tetradrachms, such as Sabakes in Egypt.

First attempts at portraiture

Although many of the first coins of Antiquity were illustrated with the images of various gods or symbols, the first ever portraiture of actual rulers appears with these Achaemenid satrapal issues in the 5th century, in particular with the coinage of Lycia. The Achaemenids had been the first to illustrate the person of their king or a hero in a stereotypical manner, showing a bust or the full body, but never an actual portrait, on their Sigloi and Daric coinage from circa 500 BCE. Before the Lycian coins with dynastic portraits, a slightly earlier candidate for the first portrait is Themistocles, the Athenian general who became a Governor of Magnesia on the Meander for the Achaemenid Empire circa 465–459, although there is some doubt that his coins may have represented Zeus rather than himself. Themistocles may have been in a unique position in which he could transfer the notion of individual portraiture, already current in the Greek world, and at the same time wield the dynastic power of an Achaemenid dynast who could issue his own coins and illustrate them as he wished. From the time of Alexander the Great, portraiture of the issuing ruler would then become a standard, generalized, feature of coinage.

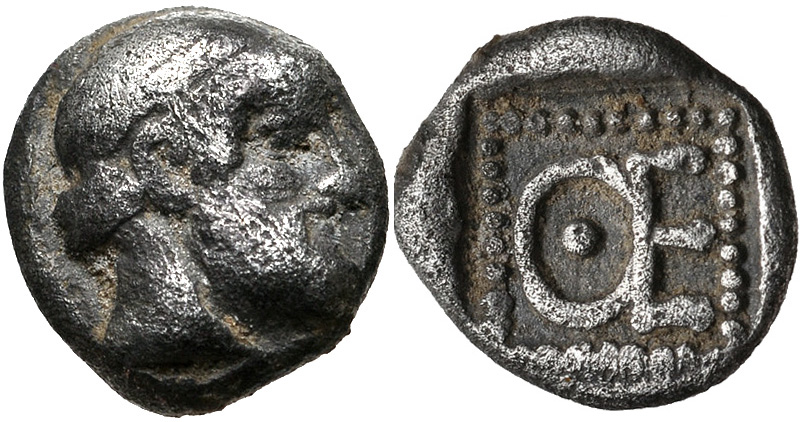
Coin of Themistocles as Achaemenid Governor of Magnesia. Rev: Letters ΘΕ, initials of Themistocles. Circa 465–459

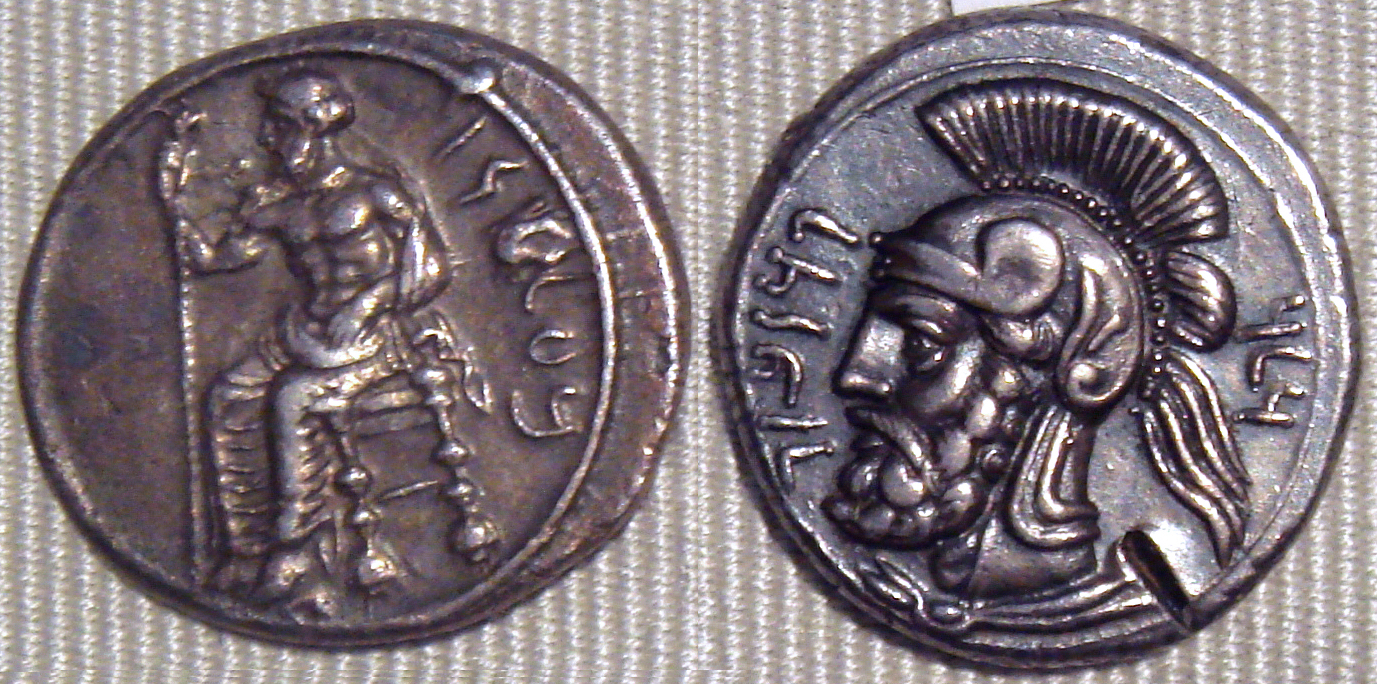
Baaltars on a throne (obverse) and head of Ares (reverse), on a double shekel of Pharnabazus II (380–375)

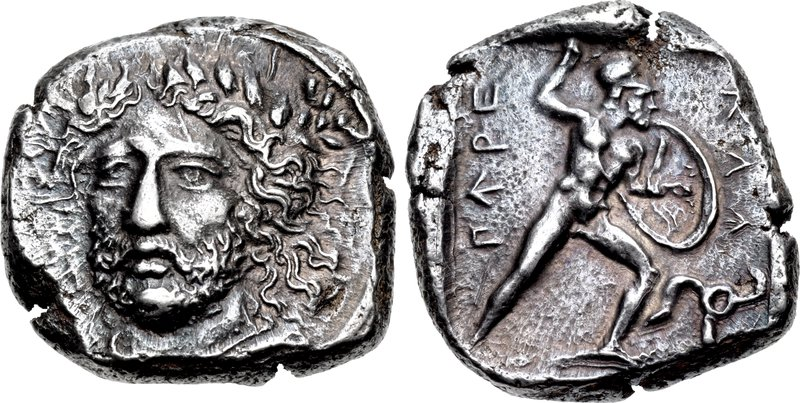
Coin of Perikles, last king of Lycia under the Achaemenids. Circa 380–360

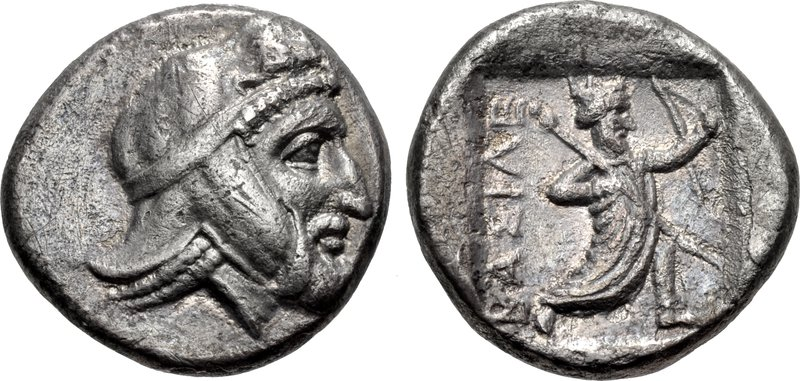
Western Asia Satrap of the Achaemenid Period. Probably Tiribazos. Early 4th century

== After the conquests of Alexander the Great ==
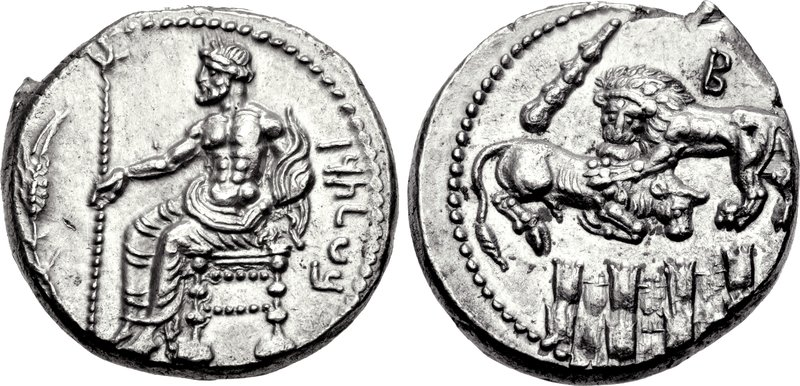
Coin of Balacrus, as Satrap of Alexander the Great in Cilicia, with Baal on the obverse. Tarsos, 333–323

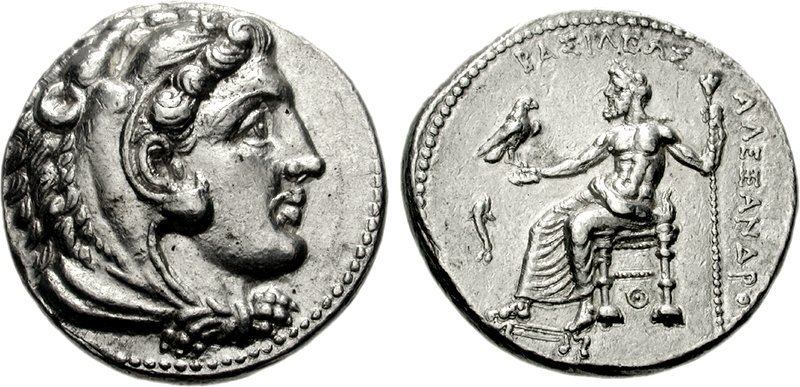
Tetradrachm of Alexander the Great with seated Zeus on the reverse, Tarsos, 323

After his conquest of the Achaemenid Empire, Alexander the Great established his own satraps in the conquered territories, some of them Achaemenids who had been favorable to the invader, such as Mazaios, others some of Alexander's closest supports, such as Balacrus. Several satraps continued to use an Achaemenid type for their coinage, such as Balacrus when he became Hellenistic satrap of Cilicia, complete with the local deity of Tarsus, Baal. This coinage is said to have later influenced Alexander's imperial coinage, which was often minted in the same mints.

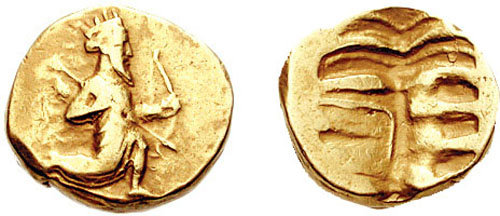
Double Daric (16.65 g). Babylon mint, struck circa 315-300-298

Even many years after the death of Alexander, Achaemenid gold darics continued to be minted in Babylon, at the same time as Alexandrine imperial issues were minted. Some of these issues are dated to circa 315–300/298. These darics continued to use the Achaemenid type, but the reverse was slightly modified to include wavy patterns.

== See also ==
- Parthian coinage
- Sasanian coinage
- Ancient Greek coinage
- Elymais

== Bibliography ==
- Bopearachchi, Osmund (2000), "Coin Production and Circulation in Central Asia and North-West India (Before and after Alexander's Conquest)", Indologica Taurinensia, 25, International Association of Sanskrit Studies
- Bopearachchi, Osmund (2017), "Achaemenids and Mauryans: Emergence of Coins and Plastic Arts in India", in Alka Patel; Touraj Daryaee (eds.), India and Iran in the Longue Durée, UCI Jordan Center for Persian Studies, pp. 15–48
- Bopearachchi, Osmund; Cribb, Joe (1992), "Coins illustrating the History of the Crossroads of Asia", in Errington, Elizabeth; Cribb, Joe; Claringbull, Maggie (eds.), The Crossroads of Asia: transformation in image and symbol in the art of ancient Afghanistan and Pakistan, Ancient India and Iran Trust, pp. 56–59, ISBN 978-0-9518399-1-1
- Cribb, Joe (1983), "Investigating the introduction of coinage in India – A review of recent research", Journal of the Numismatic Society of India: 80–101
- Cribb, J. (1985), "Dating India's Earliest Coins", in J. Schotsmans; M. Taddei (eds.), South Asian Archaeology, 1983: Proceedings from the Seventh International Conference of the Association of South Asian Archaeologistan in Westeren Europe Held in the Musees Royaux d'art et d'histoire, Brussels, Naples: Istituto Universario Orientale, pp. 535–554
- Eggermont, Pierre Herman Leonard (1975), Alexander's Campaigns in Sind and Baluchistan and the Siege of the Brahmin Town of Harmatelia, Peeters Publishers, ISBN 978-90-6186-037-2
- Kagan, J. (2009), "Archaic Greek Coins East of the Tigris: Evidence for Circulation" (PDF), Proceedings of the XIVth International Numismatic Congress, Glasgow, pp. 230–234
