= Baaltars =

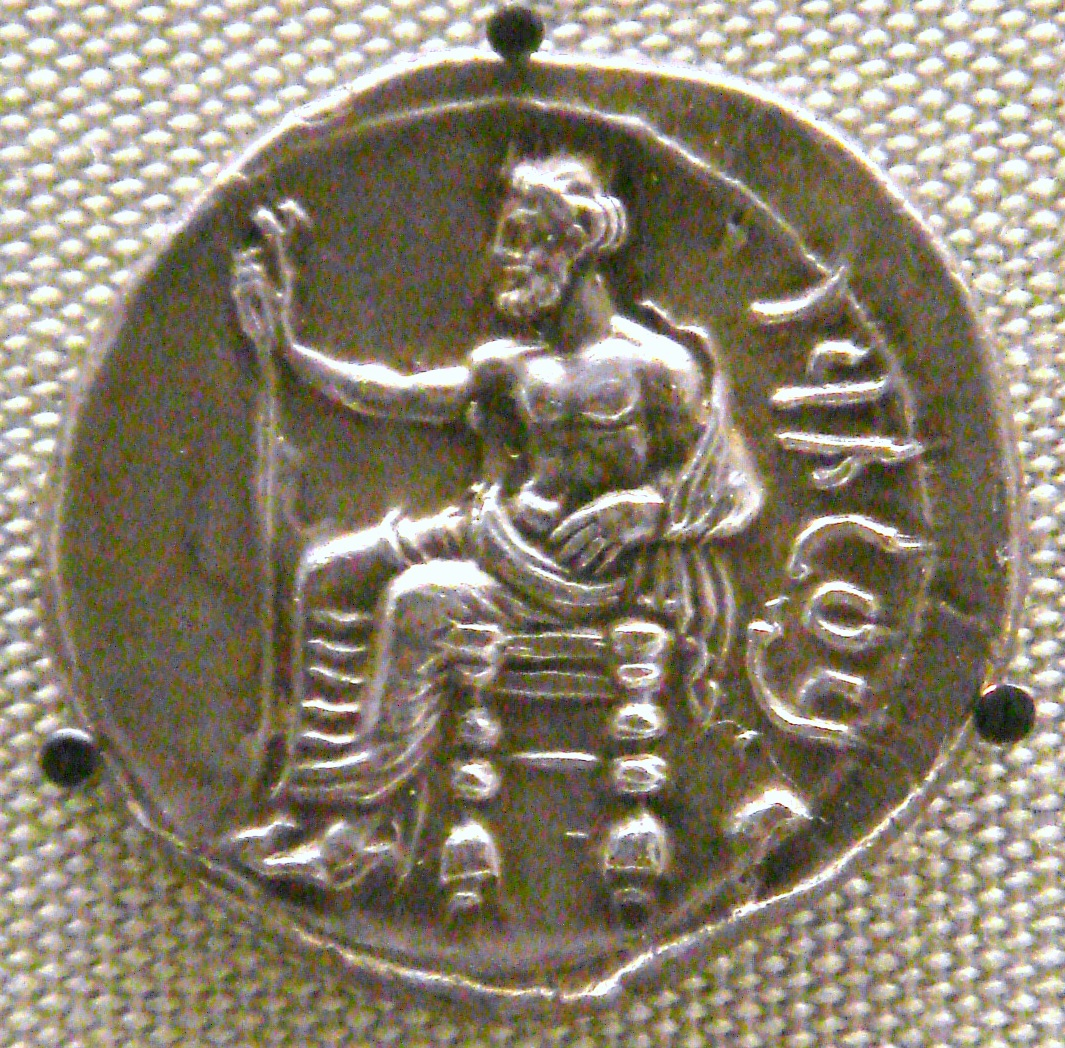
Silver stater of Pharnabazus as Satrap of Cilicia (379-374 BCE), depicting a seated Baaltars. British Museum.

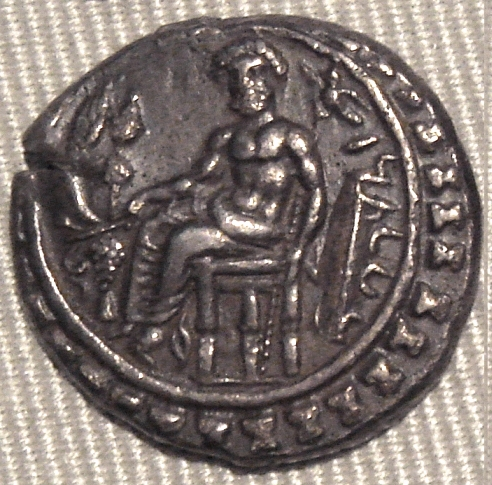
Silver coin of Datames (r. 385-362 BCE) with the God Baaltars on a throne, seated left, torsos facing, holding grapes, grain ear, and eagle in right hand, scepter in left hand, surrounded by the city walls. Cabinet des Médailles.

Baaltars (Aramaic: 𐡁𐡏𐡋𐡕𐡓𐡆, romanized: bʿltrz, lit. 'Baʿal of Tarsus') was possibly the chief deity of the city of Tarsus during the Achaemenid Empire.

The image of Baaltars featured on the legends of coins struck by Mazaeus and Datames, who were Achaemenid satraps of Cilicia, and of Pharnabazus II, who was satrap of Hellespontine Phrygia.

Baaltars was depicted holding an ear of wheat and a bunch of grapes, and was likely a local representation of the Luwian Storm-god Tarḫunzas.

Baaltars might be the same deity whom Eratosthenes of Cyrene in the 3rd century BCE called Zeus Tersios (Ancient Greek: Ζεύς Τέρσιος).

Some scholars have hypothesised that Baaltars later lost his prominence to Sandas, while Olivier Casabonne has proposed that Baaltars was also identified with Sandas/Nergal, who was in turn identified with the Phoenician god Melqart of Tyre.

== See also ==
- Achaemenid coinage
