= Beltar =

Beltar may refer to:

- Beltar, Nepal
- Beltar (Dungeons & Dragons), a lesser deity in the Greyhawk setting of the Dungeons & Dragons game
