= Daric =

Gold coin used in the ancient Achaemenid Persian Empire

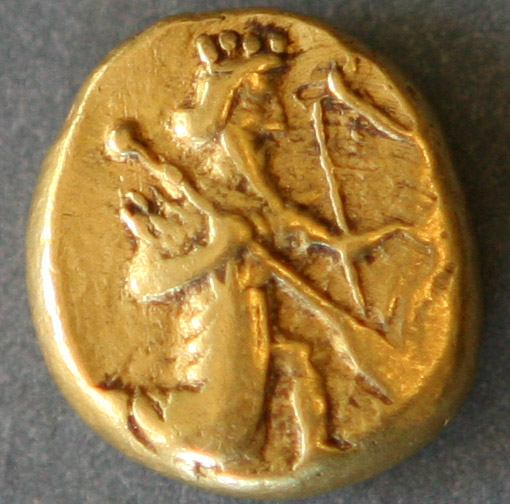
Type IIIb Achaemenid Daric, c. 420 BC.

The daric was a gold coin which, along with a similar silver coin, the siglos, represented the bimetallic monetary standard of the Achaemenid Empire.

Cyrus the Great (550–530 BC) introduced coins to the Persian Empire after 546 BC, following his conquest of Lydia and the defeat of its king Croesus, who had put in place the first coinage in history. It seems Cyrus initially adopted the Lydian coinage as such, and continued to strike Lydia's lion-and-bull coinage.

Darius I (521–486 BC) introduced a new thick gold coin which had a standard weight of 8.4 grams, equaling in value 20 silver coins. The gold used in the coins was of very high quality with a purity of 95.83% and it bore the image of the Persian king or a great warrior armed with a bow and arrow. Their use ended with Alexander the Great's invasion in 330 BC, after which they were mostly melted down and recoined as coins of Alexander.

Close to the end of the 5th century BC, the Persian satraps in Asia Minor decided to strike their own coins. Darius considered such encroachment a crime punishable by death since the right of coinage was treated as an exclusively royal prerogative. The numismatic evidence does not permit identification of the image on the darics and sigloi as anything but that of the king; it was adopted by Darius as a dynamic expression of his royal power expressly for his coin issues.

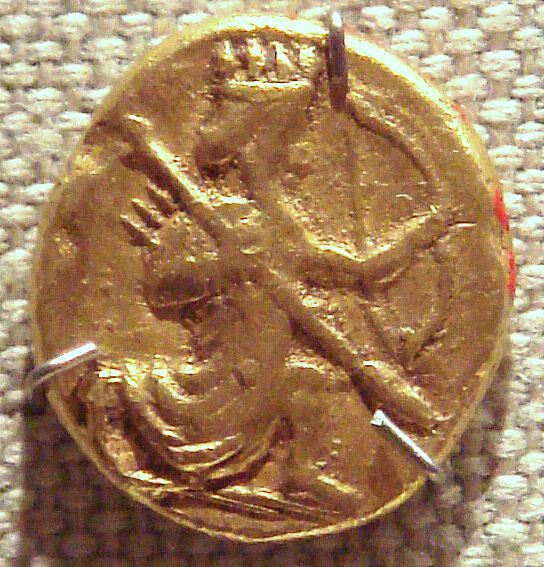
An Achaemenid daric, 4th century BC.

The coin is mentioned twice in the Hebrew Bible, where it is called the "adarkonim", as the Israelites came into contact with it when their Babylonian conquerors were conquered by Persia. The first Book of Chronicles describes King David as asking an assembly of people to donate for the construction of the Temple. The people gave generously "for the service of the house of God five thousand talents and ten thousand darics of gold, ten thousand talents of silver, eighteen thousand talents of bronze, and one hundred thousand talents of iron." Since David's reign is believed to be between c. 1010 and c. 970 BC according to Old Testament chronology, the use of the daric is either an anachronism or a conversion by the writer into contemporary units. The other instance is Ezra 8:27; also a derivative Greek term "darkemonium" is recorded in Ezra 2:69 and three times in Nehemiah 7:70-72.

After bribes distributed by a Persian satrap to start the Corinthian War in Greece led to Spartan king Agesilaus II being recalled from a successful campaign in Asia Minor, he remarked that he had been driven out of Asia by "ten (alternately thirty) thousand archers" (referring to the image stamped on the daric).

The ancient Greeks believed that the term dareikós (δαρεικός) was derived from the name of Darius the Great, who was believed to have introduced these coins. Some scholars agree with this and constructed the Old Persian word as *dārayaka-, while others have generally supposed that the Greek term can be traced back to Old Persian *dari- ("golden", which possibly evolved into the word زر [zar] in modern Persian) and that it was first associated with the name of Darius only in later folk etymology.

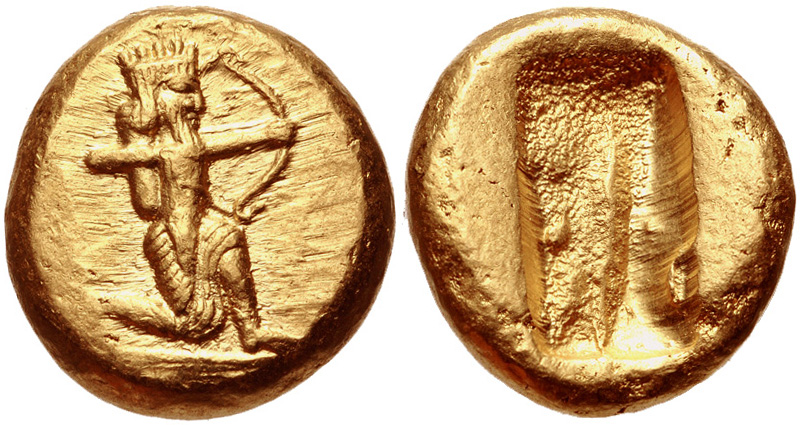
Type II Daric ("King shooting arrow") temp. Darios I to Xerxes I (Type I Darics are unknown). Circa 505-480 BC.

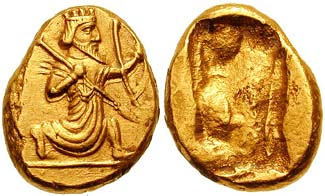
Daric Type III ("King running with lance") gold coin (mid-4th century BC)

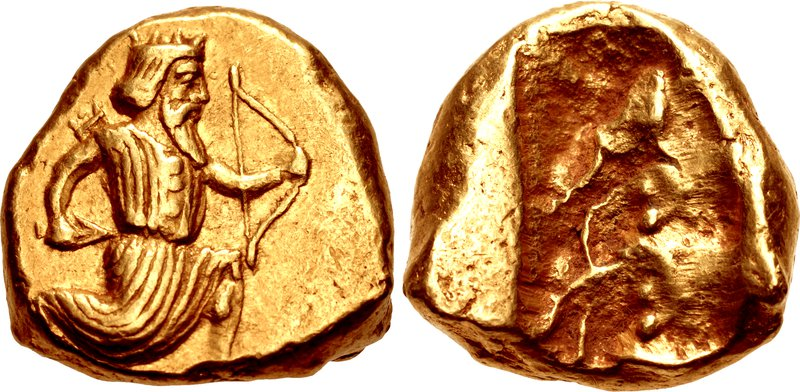
Daric Type IV ("King running with dagger"), temp. Artaxerxes II to Artaxerxes III, circa 375-340 BC. (15mm, 8.33 g)

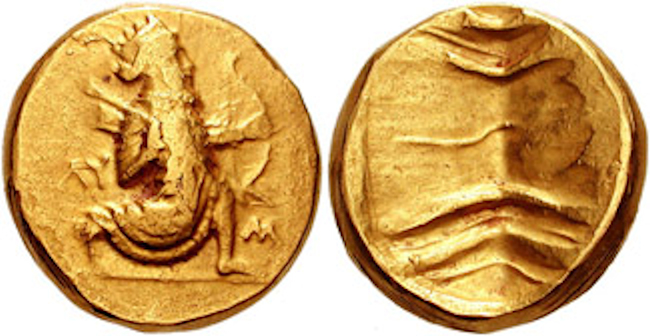
Double Daric minted, well after the conquests of Alexander the Great, in Babylon circa 322-315 BC.

== See also ==
- Achaemenid currency
