= Chinese token (alternative currency) =

Historical currency in Jiangsu

Chinese tokens (Traditional Chinese: 中國代用幣; Simplified Chinese: 中国代用币; Pinyin: zhōng guó dài yòng bì) were an alternative currency in the form of token coins produced in China during the late Qing dynasty around the time of the Taiping Rebellion in the province of Jiangsu but not by the Taiping government, which had issued its own currency. Later tokens were again issued in Jiangsu during the Japanese occupation. These tokens were typically made by merchants and local businesses as well as local authorities and had nominal values denominated in their value in cash coins.

== During the Qing dynasty ==
Qing dynasty era Chinese tokens were cast in denominations of 100 cash, 200 cash, 500 cash, and 1000 cash as well as 1 chuàn (壹串, or 100 cash coins), 2 chuàn (贰串, or 200 cash coins), and 5 chuàn (伍串, or 500 cash coins) as the contemporary definition of a "string of cash coins" (串) in the province of Jiangsu at the time was a hundred cash coins but these tokens also had denominations of 1 guàn (一貫, or 1000 cash coins). The numbers that these Jiangsu tokens were denominated in were an indication that of economic instability in the region at the time as the difference between their intrinsic and nominal value was significant. In addition to their nominal value it was common for these Chinese tokens to contain various features of Chinese charms such as "good luck" symbols, and unlike most contemporary coins these Chinese tokens may also contain chop marks which were only a feature of silver coinage such as dragon dollars at the time. Chinese tokens often had coin-like inscriptions such as wàn lì tōng bǎo (萬曆通寶), but also contained other inscriptions describing their nominal value like bǎi hé tong yuán (百合同元, "this coin has the same worth as 100 of the primary currency"), chuán bù liú shǐ (傳不流矢, "(this token) circulates without losing value"), yì qiān wén zhèng (一仟文正, "(this token) is equal to one thousand cash coins"), and yì bǎi wén zhèng (一百文正) which means "one hundred cash coins only"). These Chinese tokens often had inscriptions usually found on Chinese charms and amulets like xiáng qìng róng huá (祥慶榮華, "happiness and celebration, prosperity and high position") and rì yòng guāng huī (日用光輝, "for daily use is glorious") and could also contain other charm features such as the eight trigrams. Some Chinese tokens could also resemble Jiā Qìng Tōng Bǎo (嘉慶通寶) cash coins but with a serrated edge.

=== Lead tokens ===
Two series of lead cash coins, one with the inscription "Shengji Zuoyong" (生記作用), the other with the inscription "Hengji Dangshi" (亨記當十), are said to have circulated as an alternative currency in the Jiaxing Prefecture, Zhejiang Province during the Taiping Heavenly Kingdom period, following the occupation of the region by the rebel government. Following the establishment of the central government Minting Bureau to issue its own holy currency the lead cash coins were recalled to be melted down. However, a few people did not exchange these lead cash coins to the royal government and a small number of them have been preserved to this day.

According to insiders of the soy sauce making industry, the companies that operated the Shengji (生記) and Hengji (亨記) soy bean gardens had a large business scope during the Qing dynasty period and were also in the business of producing wine, wheat, beans, and rice, in order to do this they produced utensils made out of tin and lead. Because these two shops were equipped with tin and lead tools and the right equipment to produce lead tools, the lead cash coins produced by them is so well made. During the end of the Qing dynasty period, the people from the Jiaxing region also collected a lot of money from the Taiping Heavenly Kingdom, including the locally produced lead cash coins that served as an alternative currency, leading them to be preserved quite well by the time an article was written about them in the Cultural Relics (文物) journal in 1959.

== During the Republic of China ==
According to Zhang Guomin, during the early Republican era most of these token coins were manufactured and circulated in southern Jiangsu and Zhejiang, and were extremely common in the Wujin region. By the year 1938 several factors created the environment to make these token coins flourish, the occupying Japanese forces were seizing all copper coins for the production of weaponry, the international price of copper had risen substantially, and the Chinese resistance was hoarding copper and silver coins. The companies that had produced these Chinese tokens were previously medal-makers and silversmiths and saw their businesses boom due to the demand for these low denomination bronze tokens.

A vast number of token coins were brought into general circulation and these coins were made from a number of different materials including bone, aluminium, bronze, lead, and re-used bronze. The most simple method of producing token coins was to take an old circulating coin, remove either all or only some of the coin's original design, and then stamp a new design on the coin.

On 31 March 1941 the Japanese puppet government in Nanjing had issued the "Temporary Regulations about Punishment for Obstruction to the New Legal Currency" this law affected Jiangsu, Zhejiang, Anhui, and in the cities of Nanjing and Shanghai. There is no evidence that Chinese tokens were promoted by the Chinese resistance, but one of its issuers, Zhou Rongsheng, was a Chinese resistance faction leader in Shizhuang. The continued and illegal usage of these bronze token coins might have been a source of solidarity among the people of Jiangsu.

After 1941 the Japanese puppet government over-issued paper money which lead to inflation and caused the smaller denomination token coins to disappear from circulation.

=== Zheng Lu Bridge tokens ===
Zheng Lu Bridge tokens (Traditional Chinese: 鄭陸橋錢; Simplified Chinese: 郑陆桥钱; Pinyin: zhèng lù qiáo qián) were a type of Chinese token that originated in the city of Changzhou, Jiangsu, from 1939 until 1941, these tokens were manufactured contemporary to other Chinese tokens and bamboo tallies in the same area as the Japanese invasion of China disrupted the local economy forcing locals to start issuing their own currencies in the form of exonumia. Zheng Lu Bridge tokens were issued by a variety of local stores and others and had a very limited region of circulation. These tokens were issued due to various factors including a lack of small value currency, the profitability of accepting old Chinese copper coins to be exchanged for new local tokens, as well as the lack of confidence in the currencies issued by Japanese puppet banks. Zheng Lu Bridge tokens typically contain an image of the Zheng Lu Bridge which was a bridge built during the Ming dynasty in Changzhou where at one side of the bridge a lot of people had the surname Zheng and on the other side Lu and a man with the surname Zheng and a woman with the surname Lu fell in love with each other and as the family wished to arrange a wedding for them during the spring festival they had recommended against using a ferry so as both clans were affluent enough to pay for a bridge and the bridge was finished the day prior to their wedding, because of this association with love some Zheng Lu Bridge tokens contain images of hearts, and usually contained inscriptions indicating where these tokens were intended to circulate such as zhèng lù qiáo liú tōng (鄭陸橋流通, "Circulates in Zheng Lu Bridge").

=== "Xinsheng" tokens ===
The Xinsheng [Trust Abundant] company was a delicatessen-brewery located at the Ligang East Street in the Xixishu Village, Ligang Town, Jiangyin City, Jiangsu, owned by the Zhang family, in the year 1939 this company issued their own token coins which were known as "Xinsheng tokens". The brother of the owned of the Xinsheng [Trust Abundant] company owned a meat-store in the same street and concurrently issued his own token coins known as "Chao Ji" tokens.

During this era issuing token coins was viewed as both a good way to increase a company's reputation as well as to promote their business. The Zhang family issued a total of 3,000 token coins, the cost of producing a 1 jiao token was 1 fen in legal currency, so the company made a 9 fen profit on every token coin of 1 jiao, which meant that the Zhang family made a profit of 270 yuan. Note that at this time a single dan (hectolitre) of rice cost 15 yuan, which meant that the Xinsheng delicatessen-brewery and the Zhang family made a large profit from issuing these "Xinsheng" tokens.

== Chinese tokens in the collection of the British Museum ==
In the years 1992 and 1993 the British Museum had acquired 66 token coins from 1930s Southeast China. Of these coins, 65 are round in shape, and most of these coins are circa 28 millimeters in diameter and weigh between 7 and 8 grams, making them similar in size and weight as the contemporary Chinese 10 wén coins. The other token is long in shape.

Most of the Chinese token coins in the collection of the British Museum have chops on their reverses and contain serial numbers. Most of the Chinese tokens in the collection of the British Museum are from Southern Jiangsu with the majority being from Lingtai County, Jiangsu. The most common design having the place-name on the top, the English inscription "TEN CENTS" at the bottom, and the Traditional Chinese inscription "一角" in their centre.
