= Chop marks on coins =

Chinese characters punched into coins as assayer's marks

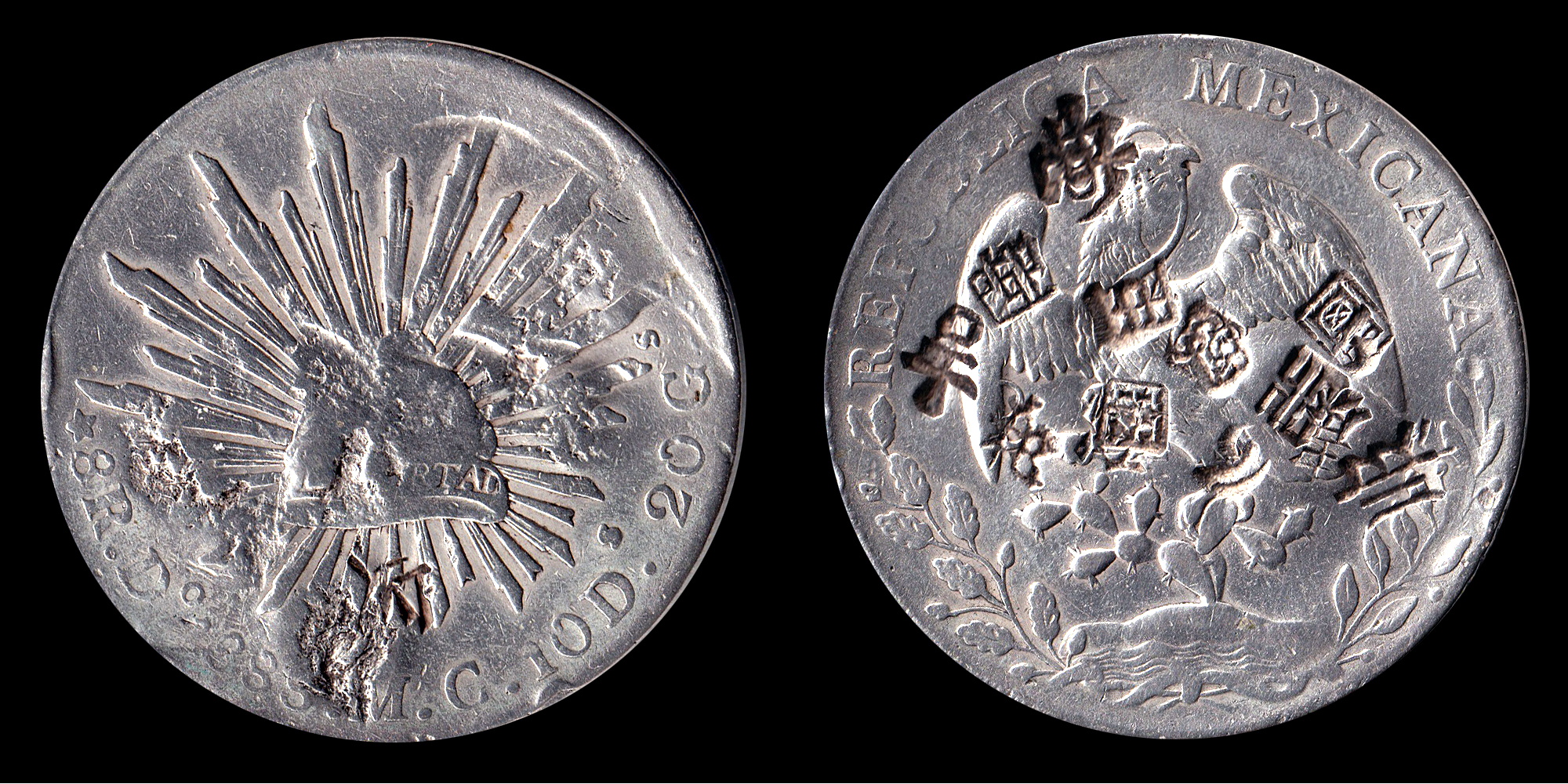
1888 Mexican 8 reales silver coin having multiple chop marks made by Chinese merchants

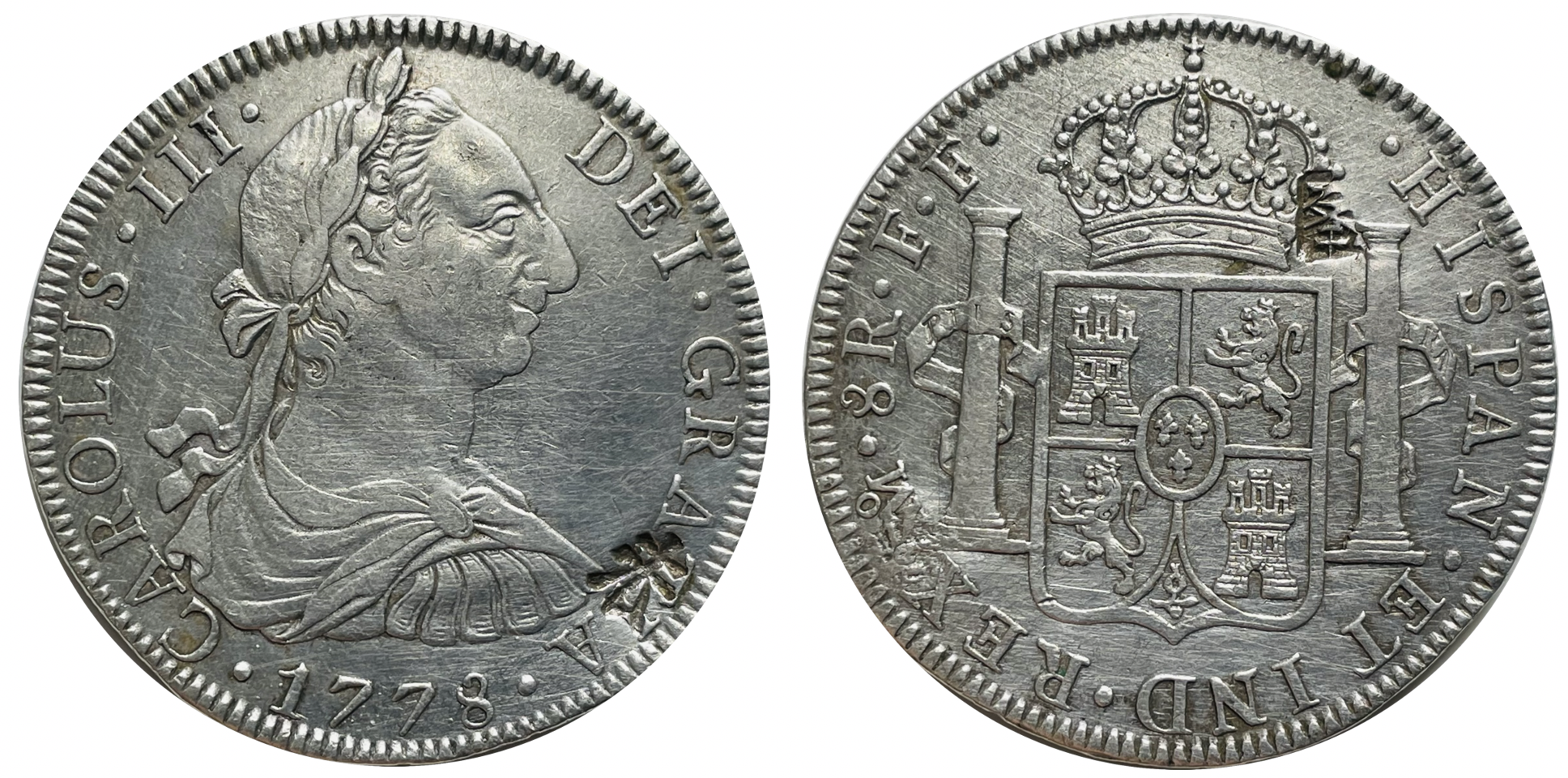
Silver coin: 8 reales Carlos III - 1778 FF

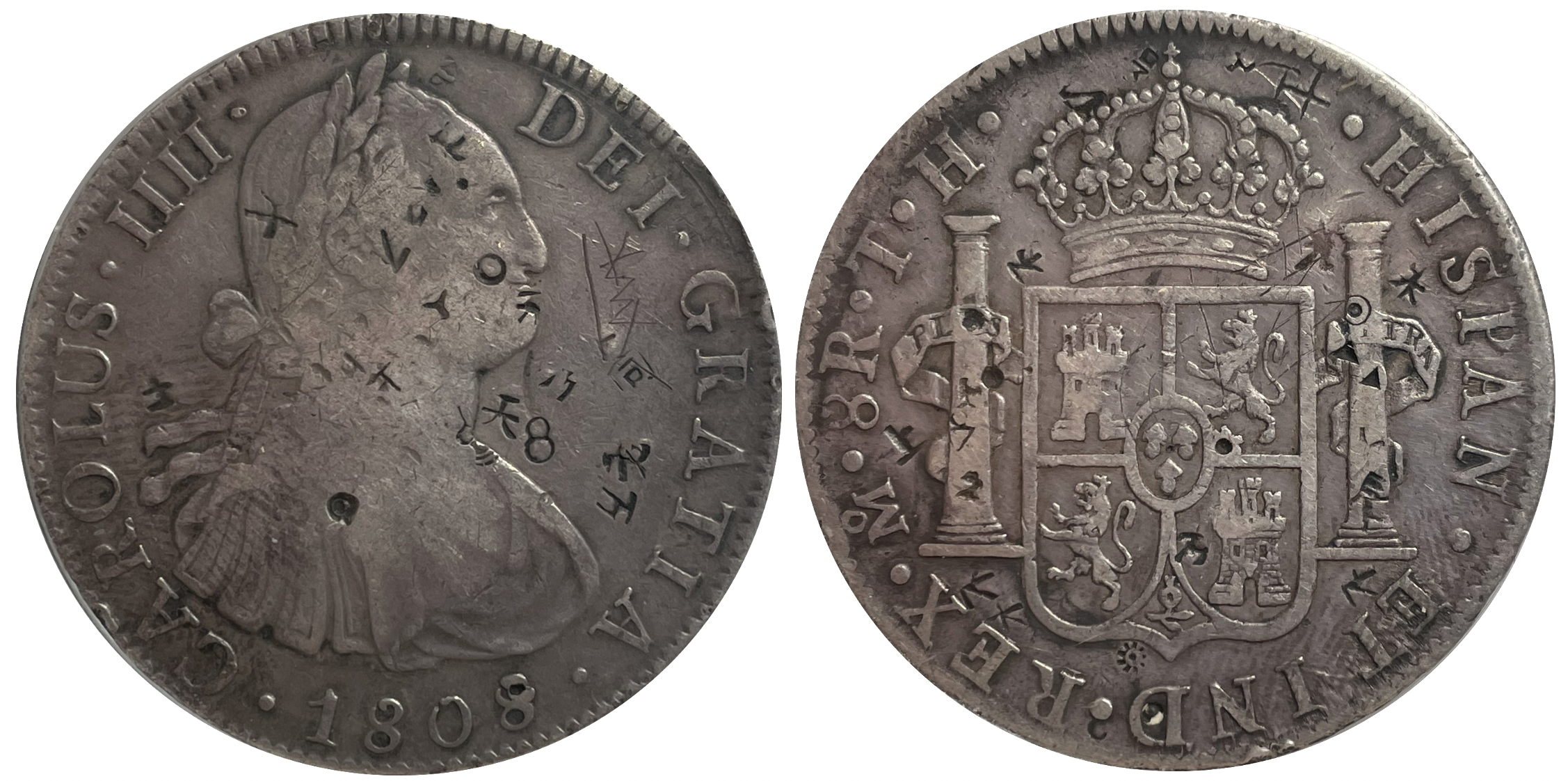
Silver coin: 8 reales Carlos IV - 1808

Chop marks on coins are Chinese characters stamped or embossed onto coins by merchants in order to validate the weight, authenticity and silver content of the coin. Depending on particular technique coins said to have been "chopmarked", "countermarked" and "counterstamped".

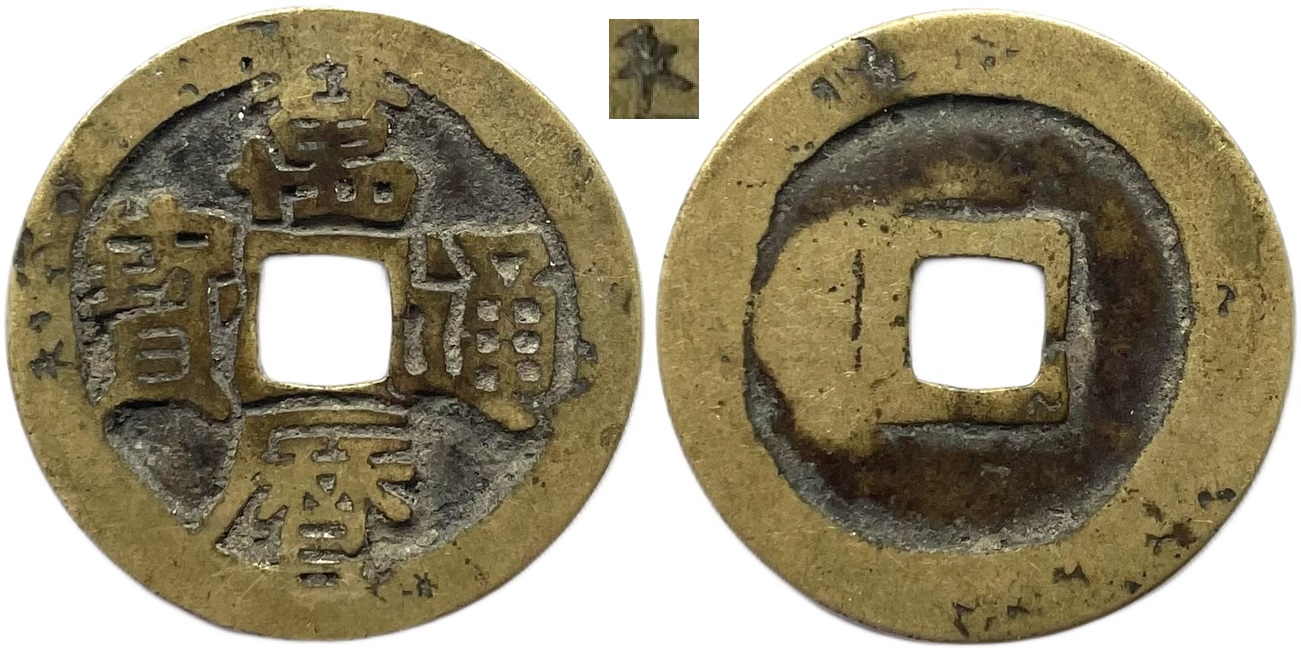
Wanli Tongbao coin with tiny chopmarks on the rims (notably Tian 天 on obverse left), believed to have been produced in Manila

The earliest chopmarks are found on bronze coins of the Wanli era of the Ming Dynasty. These have become known as "Manila Chopmarks" and are believed to have been marked in Manila by Chinese merchants. The marks are usually small and unclear but occasionally full Chinese characters, or small fish symbols, can be found. The character Tian (天), meaning "Heaven" is known from at least one example. The purpose of such chopmarks has been debated, with one theory suggesting it was a way to mark the premium full sized cash coins when compared to the diminutive small picis cash which were minted during the Wanli era. Nevertheless, these Manila Chopmarks have proven to be the earliest chopmarks in a centuries long tradition.

Starting with the 18th century, a number of European, American and Japanese silver coins (generically known as the trade dollar) began circulating in the Far East. Each merchant's firm had its own mark and, after heavy circulation, the design of the coin became completely obliterated by the chop marks.

Chop marks were also used on copper-alloy U.K. Large Pennies, U.S. Large Cents and other copper coins of Europe, Central, South and North America and have Hindu, Chinese, Japanese and Arabic nation's chopmarks as well as English alphabet chop marks from British and American Merchants in Hong Kong from the 1830s to 1960s when world silver coins and large pennies from many European and British Empire nations gave up their colonies and their coinage became demonetized. Chinese tokens from the province of Jiangsu at the time of the Taiping Rebellion, these tokens were usually issued by local authorities and could only be used to pay local merchants, tax collectors, local banks, and other local businesses during this period.

The practice lasted until China demonetized the silver coins in 1933.

== See also ==
- Overstrike (numismatics) — where a new design is struck over an existing coin
- Countermark
- Counterfeit
- Punch-marked coins
