= Overstrike (numismatics) =

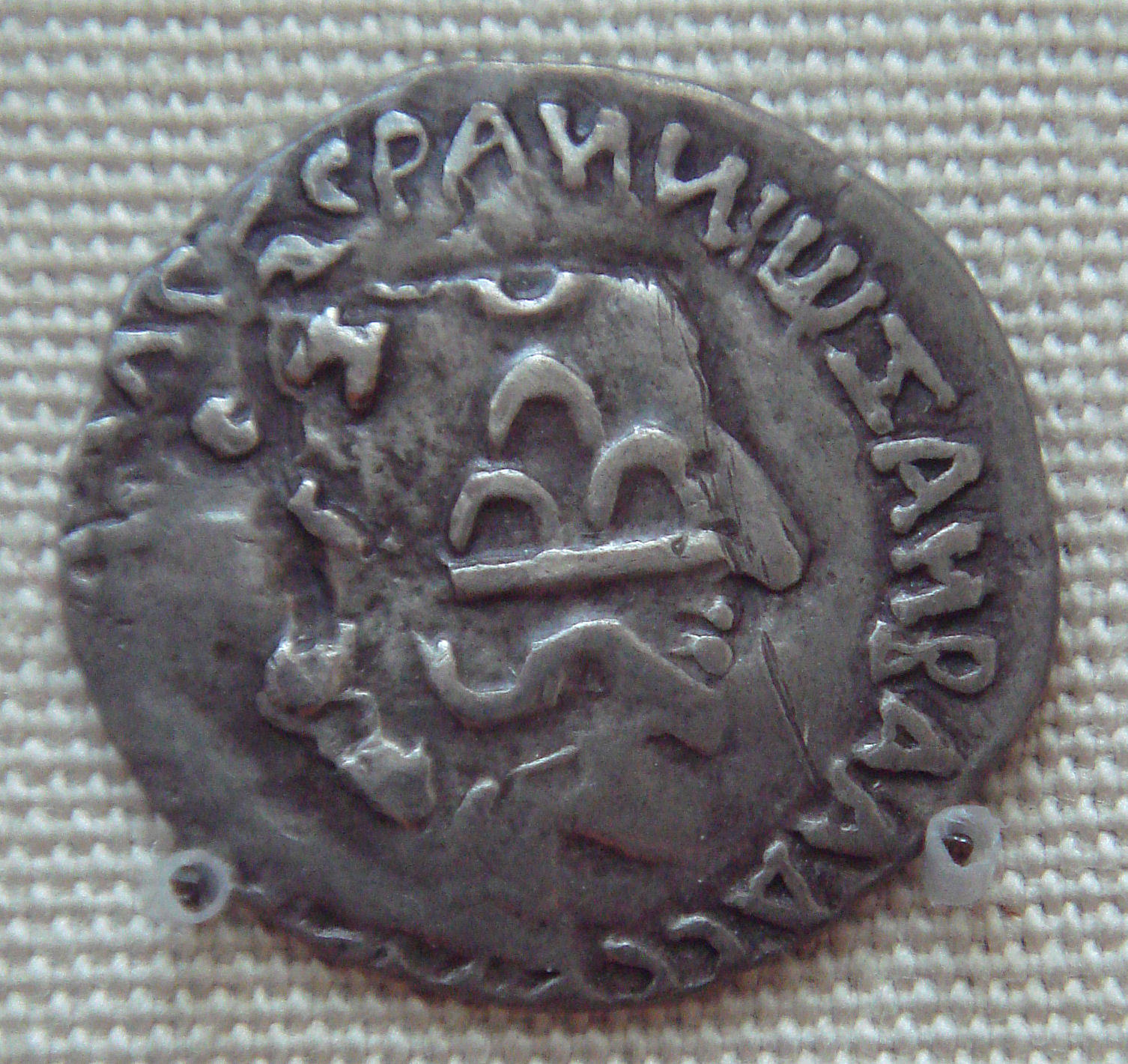
A coin of Nahapana overstruck by the Satavahana king Gautamiputra Satakarni. Nahapana's profile and coin legend are still clearly visible.

In numismatics, an overstrike describes a situation in which an existing coin rather than a blank is struck with a new design. This practice is now obsolete and generally occurred for two purposes. Overstriking was sometimes done for technical reasons when a first strike is unsatisfactory, or accidentally if the blank slips out of place or if the dies judder, resulting in a slight doubling of the design. However, sometimes old or worn coins were overstruck with new designs by later rulers or foreign states.

In the ancient world, use of overstrikes was not uncommon, since the manufacture of flans was resource consumptive; thus a foreign or outdated coin could be overstruck with less investment than new mintage. Evidence of overstriking appears as early as about 500 BC when coins of Aegina were overstruck by the ancient city of Kydonia on Crete. In this case and many others, the overstrike can be a valuable aid to dating an ancient coin, an era when dates were not commonly affixed to the design.

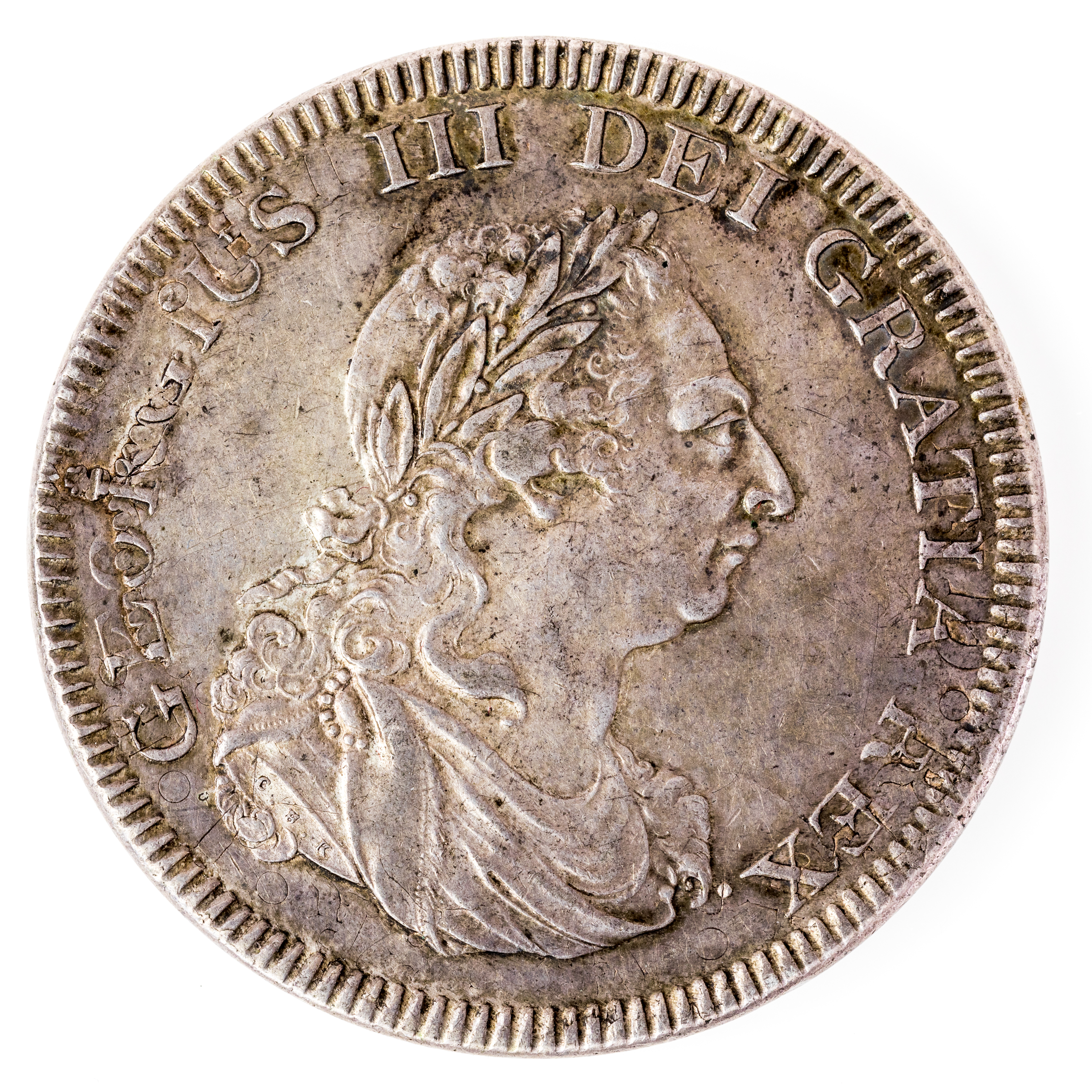
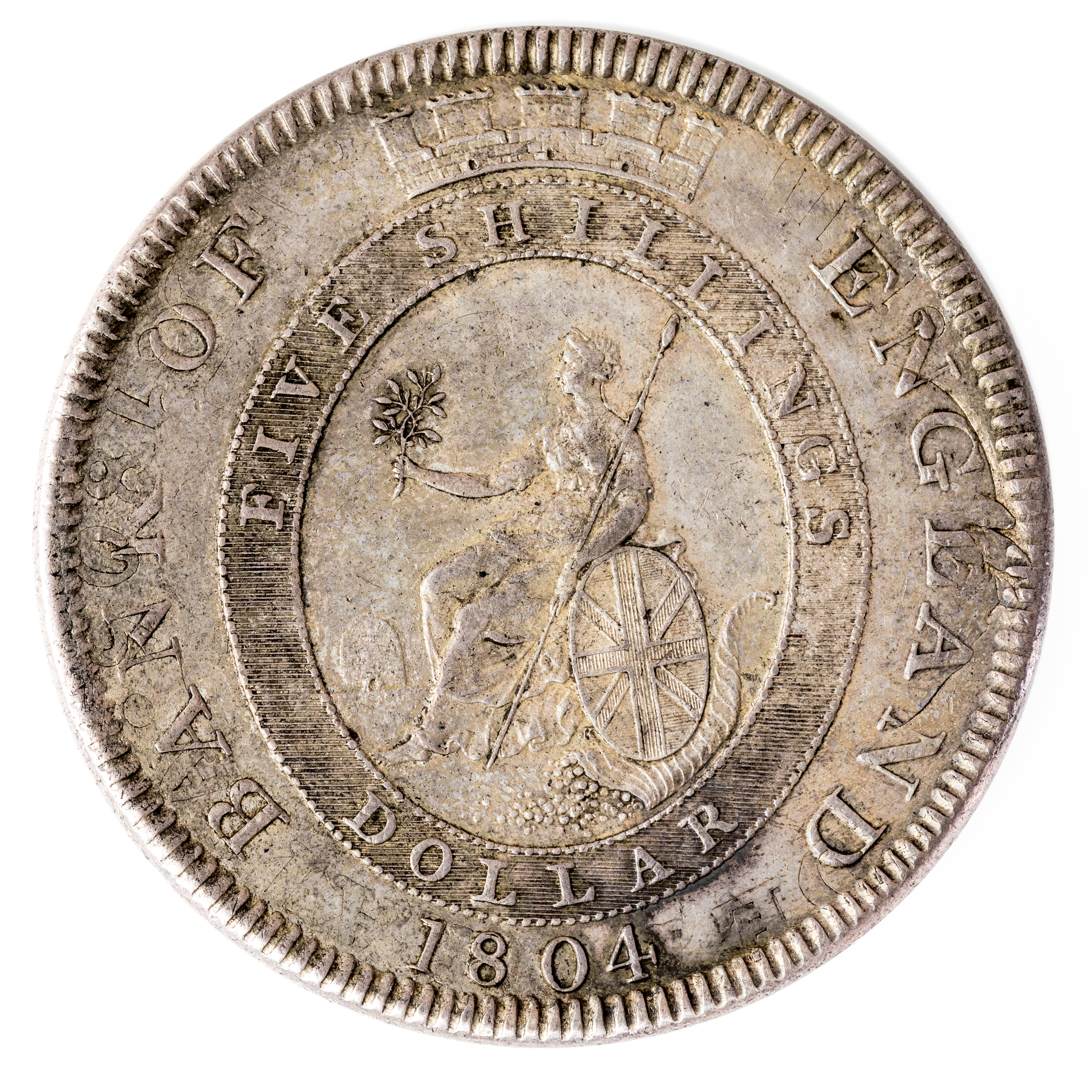
The 1804 Bank of England Dollar designed by Conrad Heinrich Küchler and overstruck on Spanish dollars

Due to a shortage of silver coinage and bullion in late-18th century Great Britain, the Bank of England in 1804 issued Bank of England Dollars bearing the image and legend of king George III and valued at five shillings; these were produced by Soho Mint on their modern, steam-powered coining presses by overstriking Spanish silver dollars.

== See also ==
- Punch-marked coins
- Planchet
- Chop marks on coins
- Countermark
- Counterfeit

== Reference sources ==
- Michael Crawford, Emilio Gabba, Fergus Millar and Anthony M. Snodgrass (1983) Sources for Ancient History, Cambridge University Press, 250 pages ISBN 0-521-28958-0
- C. Michael Hogan, Cydonia, Modern Antiquarian, Jan 23, 2008
- Otto Mørkholm, Philip Grierson and Ulla Westermark (1991) Early Hellenistic Coinage, Cambridge University Press, 273 pages ISBN 0-521-39504-6
