= Kabul hoard =

Ancient Greek–Persian coinage in Afghanistan

- Chaman Hazouri hoard
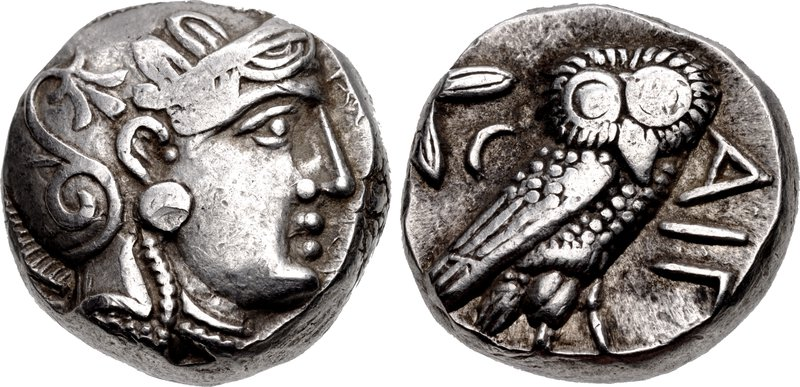
- A late Iranian imitation of 5th century Athenian tetradrachm, minted under Achaemenid rule, of the type included in the Kabul hoard (dated to 380 BCE).

- Location within Afghanistan
- 34°30′53.28″N 69°11′42″E
- Type: Coin hoard

The Kabul hoard, also called the Chaman Hazouri, Chaman Hazouri or Tchamani-i Hazouri hoard, is a coin hoard discovered in the vicinity of Kabul, Afghanistan in 1933. The collection contained numerous Achaemenid coins as well as many Greek coins from the 5th and 4th centuries BCE. Approximately one thousand coins were counted in the hoard. The deposit of the hoard is dated to approximately 380 BCE, as this is the probable date of the least ancient datable coin found in the hoard (the imitation of the Athenian owl tetradrachm).

This numismatic discovery has been important in studying and dating the history of the coinage of India, since it is one of the very rare instances when punch-marked coins can actually be dated, due to their association with known and dated Greek and Achaemenid coins in the hoard. The hoard proves that punch-marked coins existed in 360 BCE, as also suggested by literary evidence. According to numismatist Joe Cribb, it suggests that the idea of coinage and the use of punch-marked techniques was introduced to India from the Achaemenid Empire during the 4th century BCE. However, numerous Indian scholars see the development of coinage in the Gangetic plains as an indigenous development.

== Historical context ==
Gandhara at the northeastern corner of the Achaemenid Empire

The Kabul valley and the region of Gandhara to the west of Indus came under the Achaemenid rule during the reign of Cyrus the Great (600–530 BCE). Jointly, the region was known by its Iranian name Paruparaesanna as well as the Indian name Gandara. It was administered at first from Bactria, but organised into a separate satrapy in c. 508 BCE with a headquarters possibly at Pushkalavati (near present-day Charsadda in Pakistan). It was a tribute-paying region until the time of Artaxerxes (424 BCE), but it remained part of the royal conception of the empire until Alexander's conquest (c. 323 BCE). At Alexander's time, the region was said to be governed by hyparchs (rulers in their own right, but professing subjection to the emperor). The nature of the local administration under the Achaemenid empire is uncertain. Magee et al. note that neither the Achaemenid nor classical sources mention the presence of any satraps in Gandara. However, there were official personages encountered by Alexander's companions.

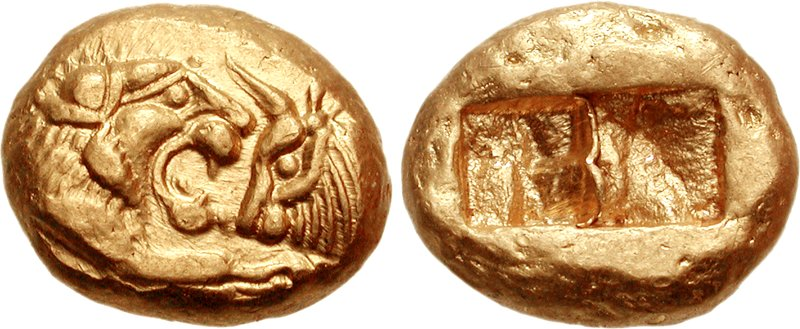
Coin type of Croesus, the Croeseid, minted in Lydia, under the rule of Cyrus the Great to Darius I. Circa 545–520.

Coinage was developed by the Greeks of the Asia Minor, influenced by the Lydian coinage in the 7th century BCE. Over the next two centuries, the use of coins spread throughout the Mediterranean area. The Achaemenid conquest of Asia minor in 540 BCE made no immediate difference to the situation: the Greek coinage continued under the Achaemenid rule and the Iranian heartland itself had little use for money. Daris I introduced new Achaemenid coins, gold darics and silver sigloi, primarily as replacements for the Lydian coins in the Asia minor. While the darics proved to be popular, the sigloi did not catch on. The Greek cities continued to mint their own silver coins. A mix of these Greek silver coins and the Achaemenid sigloi thus began to circulate throughout the Achaemenid empire, the Greek coins generally being in a majority.

== Discovery and storage of the hoard ==
Chaman-i Hazouri in Kabul

The hoard was discovered by a construction team in 1933 when digging for foundations for a house near the Chaman-i Hazouri park in central Kabul. According to the then director of Délégation Archéologique Française en Afghanistan (DAFA), the hoard contained about 1,000 silver coins and some jewellery. 127 coins and pieces of jewellery were taken to the Kabul Museum and others made their way to various museums in British India and elsewhere. Some two decades later, Daniel Schlumberger of DAFA published photographs and details of the finds stored in the Kabul Museum in a book titled Trésors Monétaires d'Afghanistan.

The Chaman-i-Hazouri coins remained at the Kabul Museum until 1992–1993, at which time the Afghan mujahideen plundered the museum. All the coins were lost (along with various other artifacts). Some two years later, 14 coins from the collection surfaced in a private collection in Pakistan. Osmund Bopearachchi and Aman ur Rahman published their details in the book Pre-Kushana Coins in Pakistan (1995).

== Description of the hoard ==
The hoard suggests, together with other coin finds in the areas of Afghanistan and Pakistan that Greek coins had found their way to India, at least as far as the Indus, well before the conquests of Alexander the Great. This happened under the rule of the Achaemenids. The Achaemenid sigloi themselves were a small minority, just as in the hoards from other parts of the empire.

Daniel Schlumberger published descriptions of 115 coins from those in the Kabul Museum. They included 30 coins from various Greek cities, about 33 Athenian coins and an Iranian imitation of an Athenian coin, 9 royal Achaemenid silver coins (siglos), 29 locally minted coins of said to be of a "new kind" and 14 punch-marked coins in the shape of bent bars. It seems that the Classical Greek and Achaemenid coins were imported from the west.

=== Achaemenid siglos coins ===
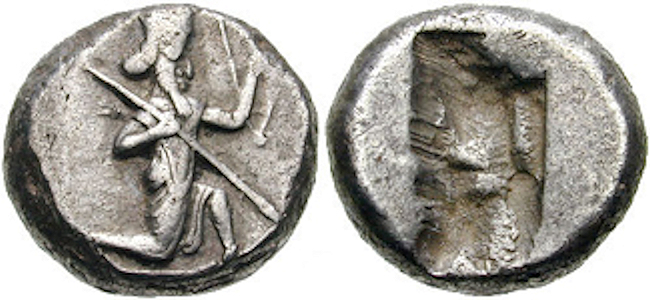
A royal Achaemenid siglos, 485-470 BCE (Archer king type). Coins of this type were also found in the Bhir Mound hoard of Taxila.

Several Achaemenid siglos coins were found in the hoards of Kabul (deposit dated circa 350 BCE) and Bhir Mound hoard of Taxila (deposit dated circa 300 BCE), which were evidently transmitted from the western part of the Achaemenid Empire. They typically show a crowned Achaemenid king running to right, holding bow and spear (Archer king type), with a rectangular punch-mark on the reverse. The several coin hoards discovered in the East of the Achaemenid Empire generally have very few sigloi, suggesting that the circulation of sigloi was actually quite small compared to the circulation of Greek coinage (both Archaic and early Classical) in those part of the Empire.

Coins of this type were also found in the Bhir Mound hoard of Taxila.

=== Greek coins ===
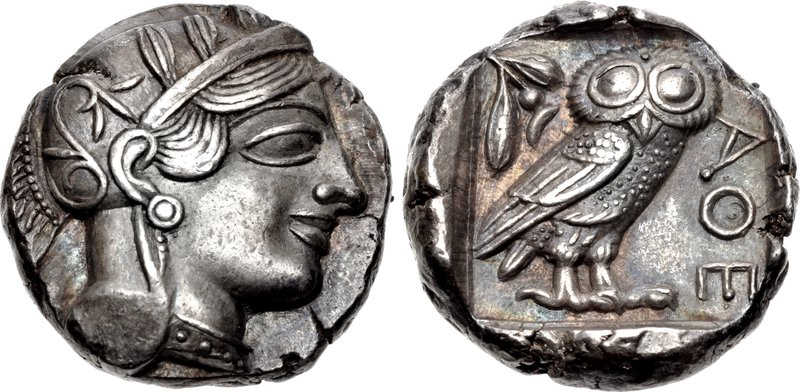
Early Classical coins from Athens were by far the most numerous coin type in the Kabul hoard. Circa 454-404 BCE. "AΘE" for "Athens" in the right field on the reverse.

The Greek coins recorded in the hoard were 30 coins from various Greek cities and about 34 from Athens with one Iranian imitation. Generally, Greek coins (both Archaic and early Classical) are comparatively very numerous in the Achaemenid coin hoards discovered in the East of the Achaemenid Empire, much more numerous than sigloi, suggesting that the circulation of Greek coinage was central in the monetary system of those part of the Empire.

Archaic Greek coin types from the Kabul hoard

The Kabul hoard contained some archaic Greek coin types (minted before 480 BCE), among them: archaic staters from Aegina, Thasos and Chios. These early coins were made using a die on the obverse with an illustrative design, while the back was formed with simple geometric punch-marks.

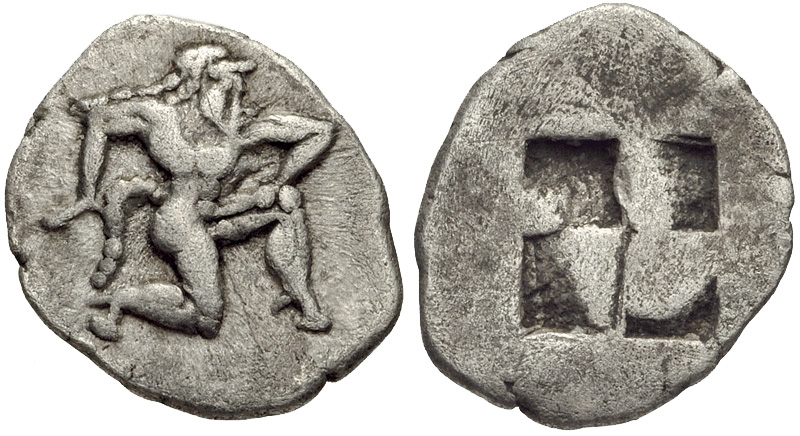
Archaic coin of Thasos, circa 500-463 BCE.

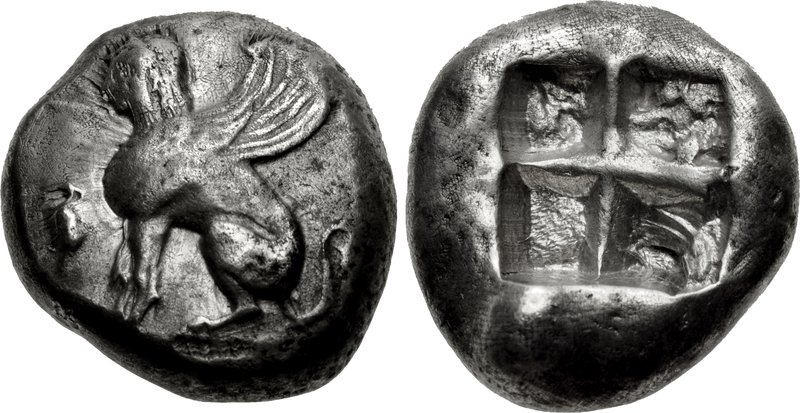
Archaic coin of Chios, circa 490-435 BCE. Earlier types known.

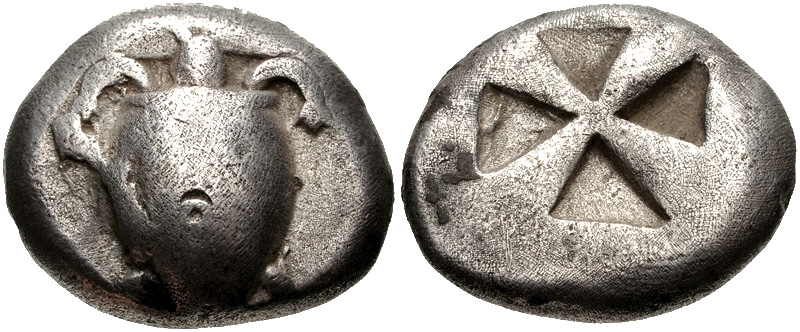
Archaic Aegina coin type, "windmill pattern" incuse punch. Circa 510-490 BCE.

Early classical Greek coin types from the Kabul hoard

In addition, there were two early classical tetradrachms from Akanthos as well as a stater from Corcyra. There were also coins from the cities of Levant: Pamphylia, Cilicia and Cyprus. Numismatist J. Kagan states that these coins must have reached the Kabul area soon after they were minted.

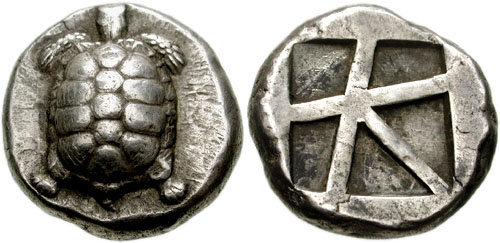
Aegina coin type, incuse skew pattern. Circa 456/45-431 BCE.

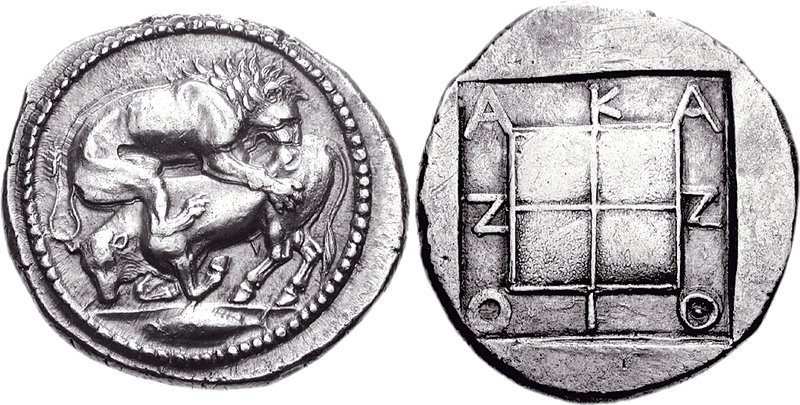
Coin of Akanthos, Macedon. Circa 470-430 BCE.

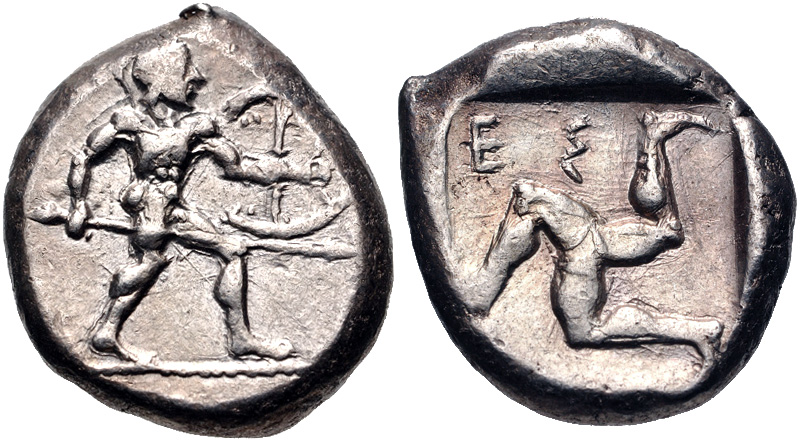
Coin of Aspendos, Pamphylia, circa 465-430 BCE.

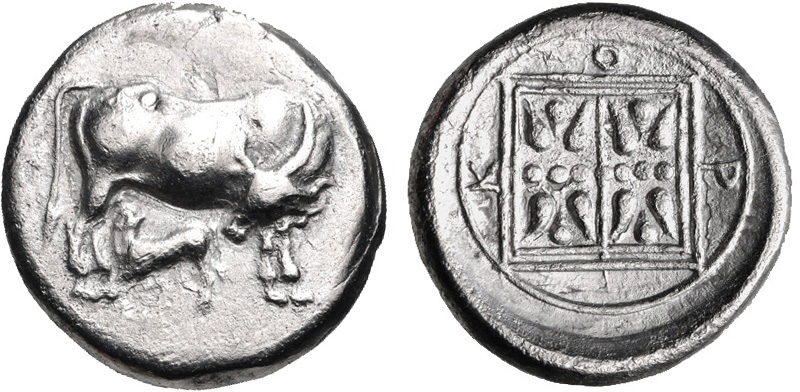
Coin from Korkyra. Circa 350/30-290/70 BC (similar but older, early classical issues were in the hoard).

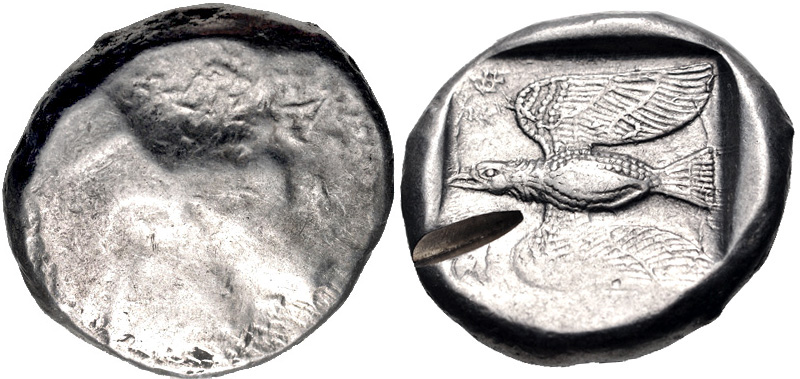
Coin of Cyprus, circa 450 BCE.

Bopearachchi and Cribb state that these coins "demonstrate in a tangible way the depth of Greek penetration in the century before Alexander the Great's conquest of the Achaemenid satrapies." According to Joe Cribb, these early Greek coins were at the origin of Indian punch-marked coins, the earliest coins developed in India, which used minting technology derived from Greek coinage.

=== Round punch-marked coins ===
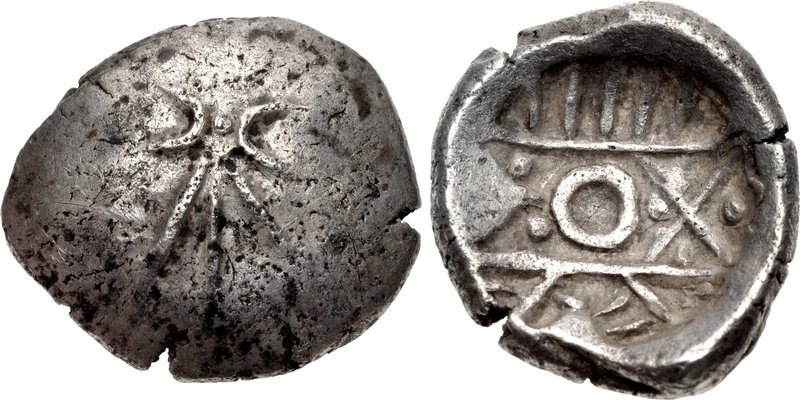
Punch-marked coin minted in the Kabul Valley under the Achaemenid administration. Circa 500-380 BC, or c.350 BCE.

Schlumberger labelled 29 round punch-marked coins found in the hoard as being "of a new kind", not found elsewhere. They are round, elliptic, or cup-shaped coins of the Achaemenid weight standard; struck with one, two or several punches. They usually display a sort of arrow symbol on the obverse, and circular geometric symbols on the reverse. Similar coins have also been found in the Shaikhan Dehri hoard in Pushkalavati in the center of the Gandhara area, but not in Taxila.

Their dispersal in Kabul and Pushakalavati led Bopearachchi to postulate that they were manufactured locally, while the region was under Achaemenid protection, during the 5th century BCE. Some scholars also believe them to have been a "product of the local Achaemenid administration". However, others state that the local administration was largely autonomous and followed an independent monetary policy. According to Joe Cribb, these coins were locally made imitations of Greek coins, with some pictorial, but mostly non-pictorial designs, using weight standards derived from Greek and Persian coinage.

According Bopearachchi, these coins illustrate the transition from regular round coinage to Indian punch-marked coins. First, these coins have been shown to be the chronological predecessors of and bent and punch-marked coins. Second, they were minted according to the Achaemenid weight standard of 1 siglos (5.5 grams), or 2 siglos (11 grams).

Design evolution of the round coins

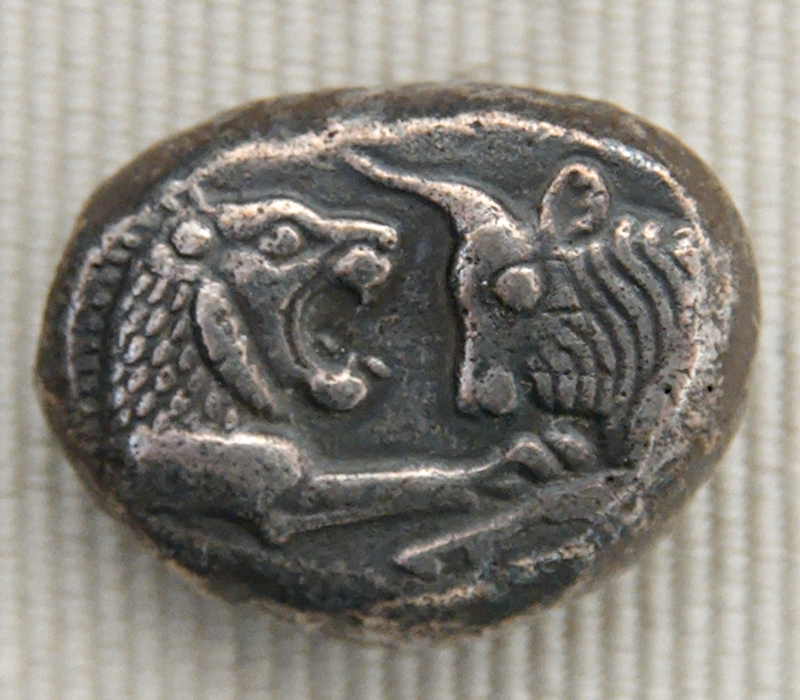
Silver coin issued by King Croesus of Lydia (561–545 BC), obverse: facing busts of lion and bull.

Lastly, the round coins in the Kabul hoard display a marked evolution in design: the series starts with simple round coins struck on the obverse and reverse with animal motifs reminding of the "western designs" of Croesus, or Achaemenid motifs. In particular, the round coins which are considered the oldest in the hoard, have an obverse design consisting in the facing busts of two bulls, evocative of the design of the mid-6th century coins of Croesus with the facing busts of a lion and a bull, generally considered as the first coins ever to be minted. Other western designs include a stag, or double Persian column capitals.

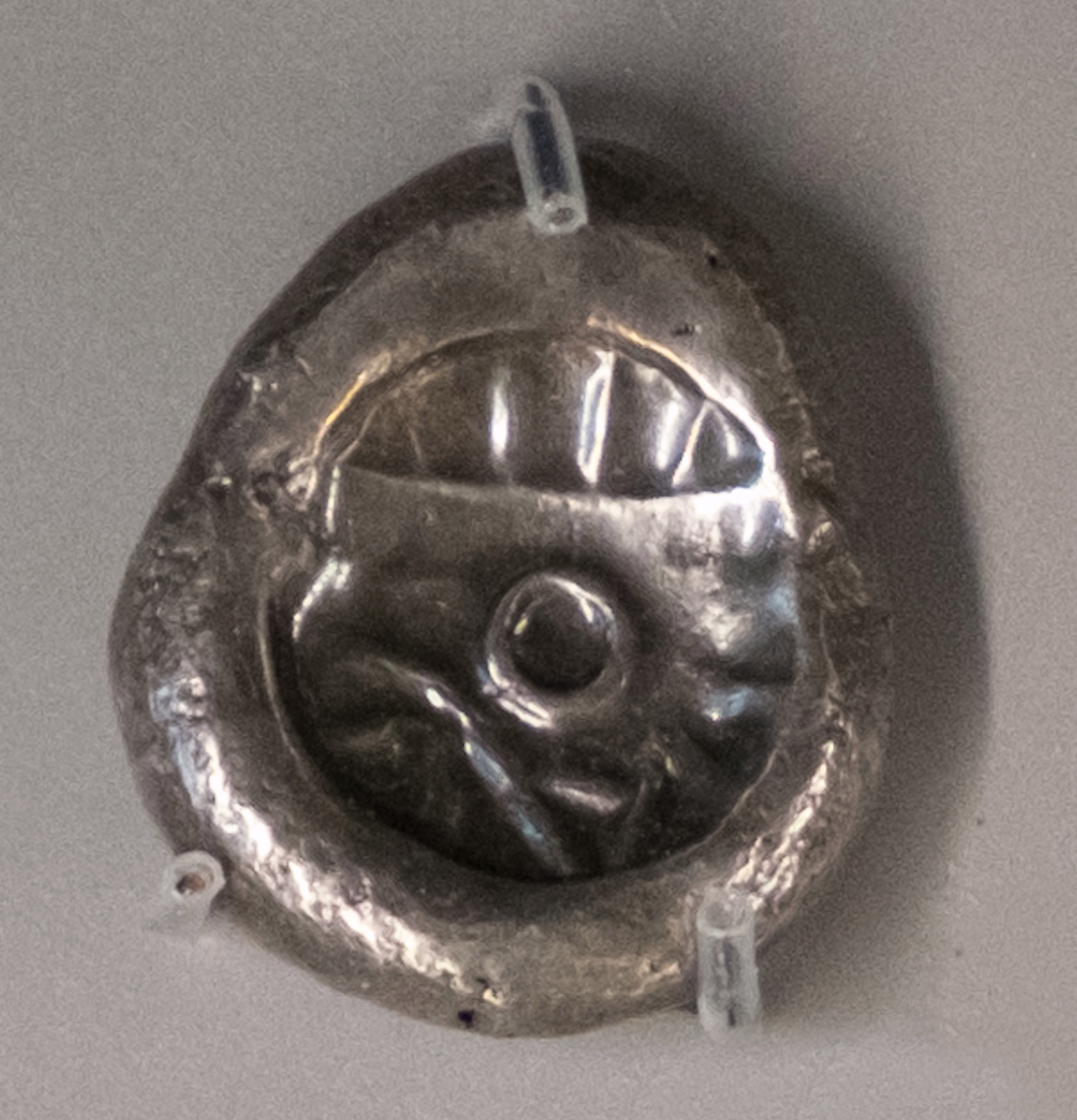
Coinage of Afghanistan, circa 400 BCE

In later coins, the obverse design is progressively abandoned, and the reverse becomes a punch mark which progressively evolves to more symbolic motifs (such as the cup-like coins with lines around a central circle), before reaching a stage were the round coins are struck with multiple punches.

In summary, these coins were "the precursors of the bent and punch-marked coins", and "the use of independent punches is at the origin of the striking of Indian "coins with multiple punch-marks". Mauryan kings later issued descendants of these very coins in the territories south of the Hindu Kush for local circulation.

=== Short punch-marked bent-bars ===
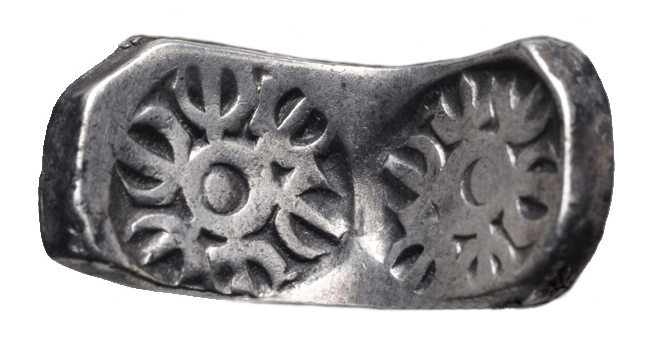
Short "bent-bar" punch-marked coin minted under Achaemenid administration, of the type found in large quantities in the Chaman Hazouri.

The round punch-marked coins have been shown to precede chronologically the "bent bars", also minted under Achaemenid rule from Bactria to the Punjab. The practice of using unmarked silver bars for currency is known from the Iranian plateau and seems to have been current in Central Asia under the Achaemenid Empire. The bent bars are believed to have been derived from that practice, representing "a marriage between Greek coinage and Iranian bar currency".

The short "bars with punch-marks" (28x15mm) discovered in Chaman Hazouri are attributed to the Paropamisadae by Bopearachchi. Their design uses two circular symbols punched at each end of one face of the bar. These bent bars are clearly reminiscent of later punch-marked Indian types, which use several of the designs of these coins "of a new kind". The "long bars" with punch marks (42x10mm), of which none were found in the Kabul hoard, are attributed to the area of Gandhara, as well as in the Bhir Mound hoard in Taxila.

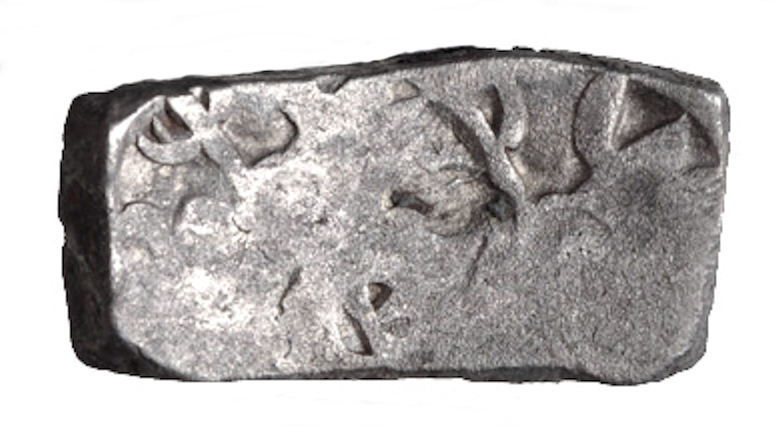
Another example of a short "bent-bar" punch-marked coin minted under Achaemenid administration.

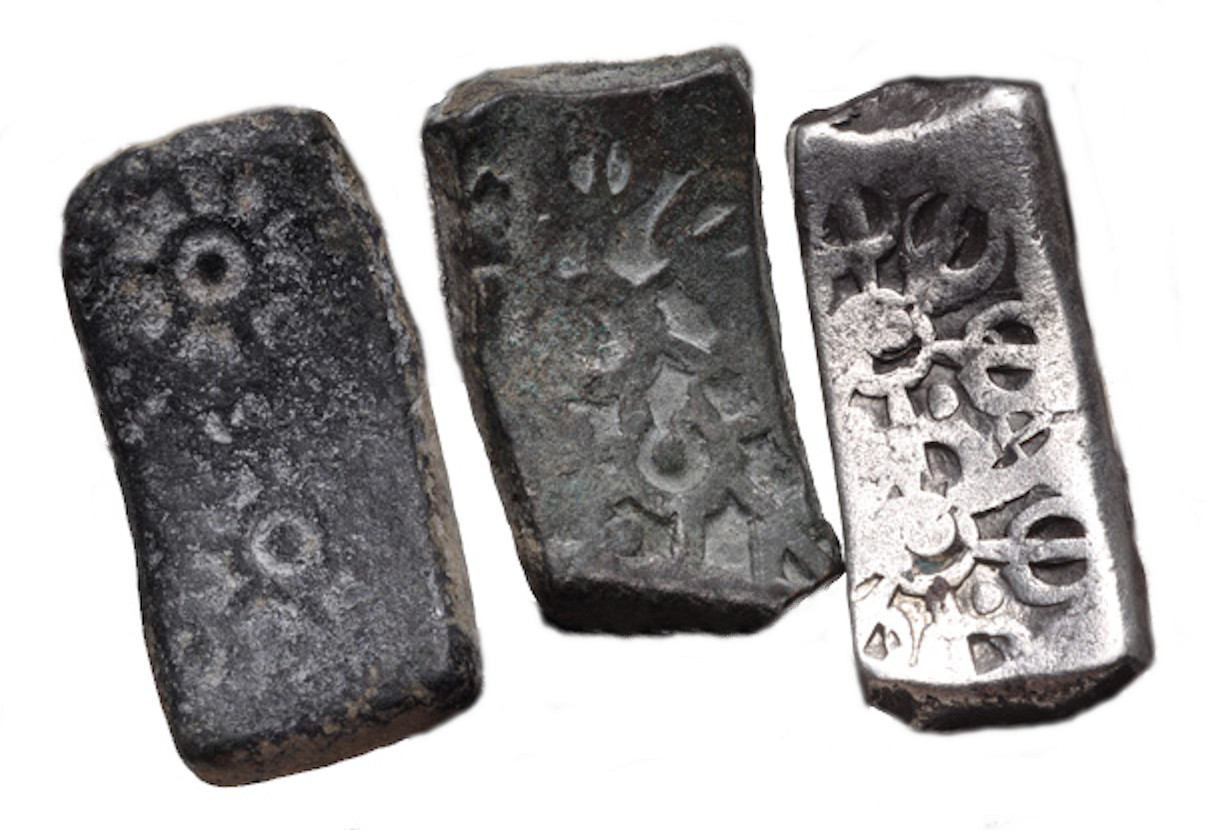
Short punch-marked bent bars, of the type attributed to the Paropamisadae under the Achaemenids.

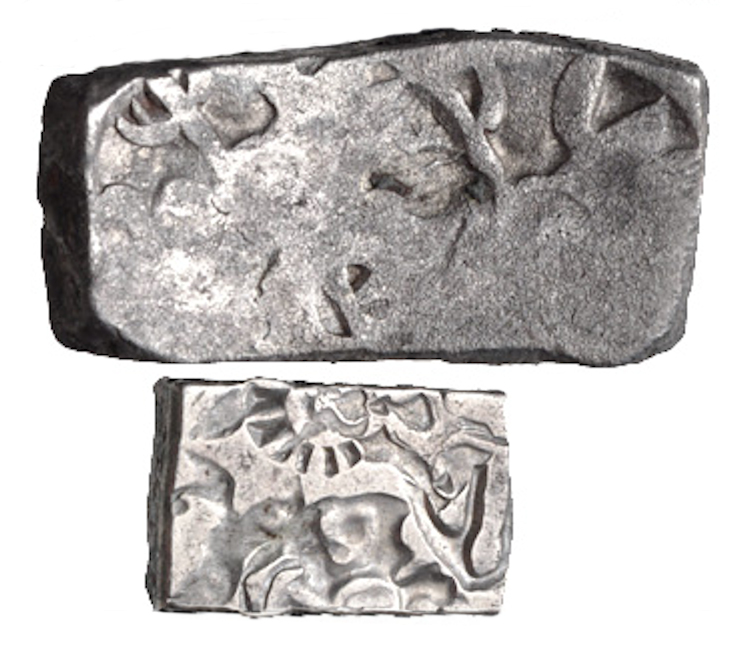
Comparison between Paropamisadae short punch-marked bent bars, and a Mauryan punchmarked karshapana.

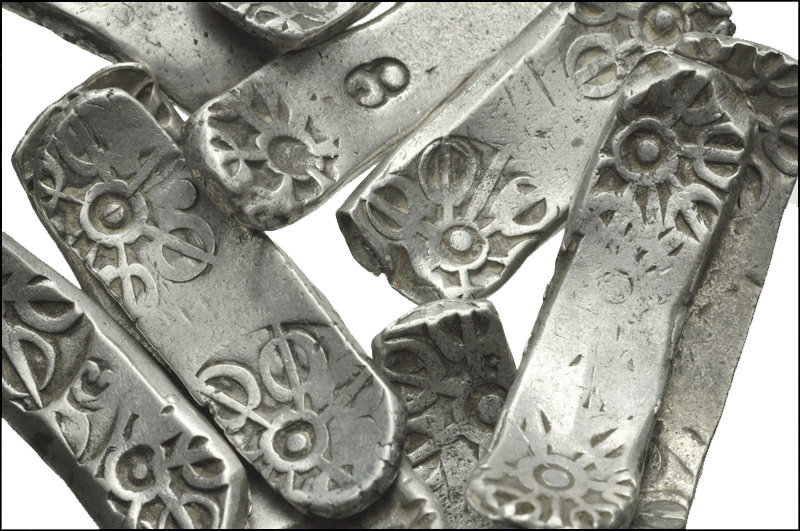
The bars found in Taxila generally use the same motifs but are elongated.

Development of Indian punch-marked coins

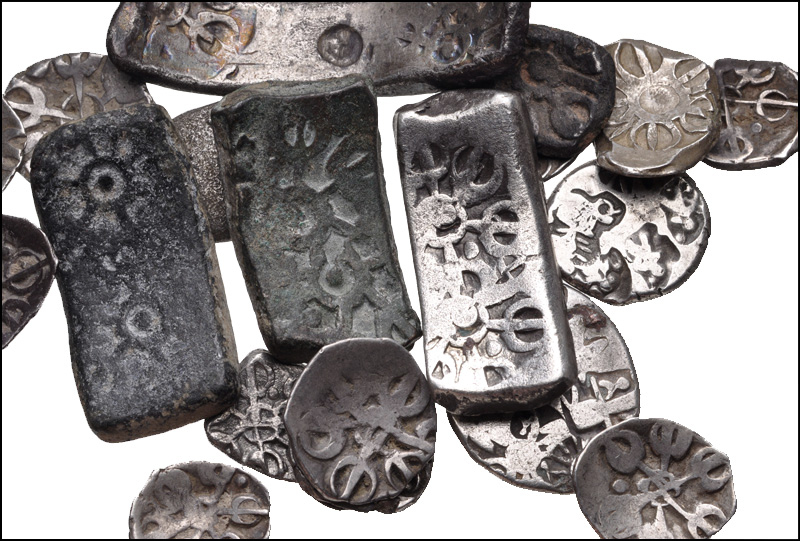
Mix of short Paropamisadae punch-marked bent bars, a long Taxila one, Gandharan round coins and Mauryan round punch-marked coins from Gandhara.

According to Joe Cribb the earliest punched-marked bent-bars are found in the northwest of the continent, and their simple designs was then adopted in the Gangetic plains, before designs evolved there towards the usage of more numerous punches on each coin. This is also proven by the fact that the Gangetic plains have no known coin designs anterior to their simple punch-marked bars, whereas the Kabul/Gandhara punch-marked bars were preceded there by the round punch-marked coins with symbols, minted under the Achaemenids.

Daniel Schlumberger too considers probable that punch-marked bars, similar to the many punch-marked bars found in northwestern India, initially originated in the Achaemenid Empire, rather than in the Indian heartland:

"The punch-marked bars were up to now considered to be Indian (...) However the weight standard is considered by some expert to be Persian, and now that we see them also being uncovered in the soil of Afghanistan, we must take into account the possibility that their country of origin should not be sought beyond the Indus, but rather in the oriental provinces of the Achaemenid Empire"

— Daniel Schlumberger, quoted from Trésors Monétaires, p.42.

== Impact on the dating of Indian punched-marked coins ==
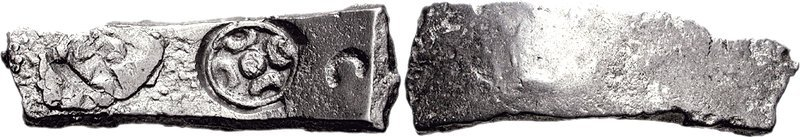
India Early northern trade coinage.

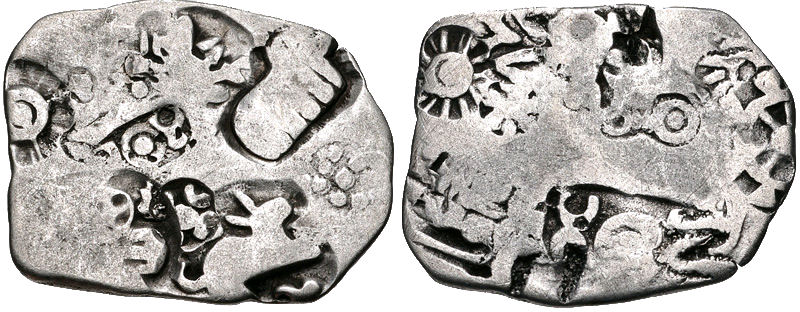
Multi punch-marked coins from the Gangetic plains were probably derived from the early Achaemenid punch-marked designs found in the Chaman Hazouri hoard.

There is uncertainty regarding the actual time punch-marked coinage started in India, with proposals ranging from 1000 BCE to 500 BCE. However, the study of the relative chronology of these coins has successfully established that the first punch-marked coins initially only had one or two punches, with the number of punches increasing over time.

According to Joe Cribb, the study of the Chaman Hazouri hoard suggests that Indian punch-marked coins may only go back to the mid-4th century BCE or slightly earlier, and actually started with the punch-marked coinage of the Achaemenids in the Kabul/Gandhara area. This date remains consistent with various literary works mentioning the usage of coinage in India. This early design was then adopted in the Gangetic plains to evolve towards multi-punch-marked coins.

Another find that can be dated was made in Kausambi, where silver-plated forgeries imitating the early types of punch-marked coins and bars from Chaman Hazouri were found in the Mauryan Empire levels associated with the Pillar of Ashoka that can be found there. This is another indication that the earliest punch-marked coins only date from around the mid-4th century BCE, and that they were still the standard coinage of reference at the time of the early Mauryan Empire (mid-3rd century CE).

However, historian Romila Thapar has stated that the punch-marked coins were in circulation before the Mauryan rule and the general opinion adheres to the 6th century BCE as the date of their introduction.

== Connected findings ==
In 2007 a small coin hoard was discovered at the site of ancient Pushkalavati (Shaikhan Dehri hoard) in Pakistan. The hoard contained a tetradrachm minted in Athens circa 500/490-485 BCE, together with a number of local types as well as silver cast ingots. The Athens coin is the earliest known example of its type to be found so far to the east.

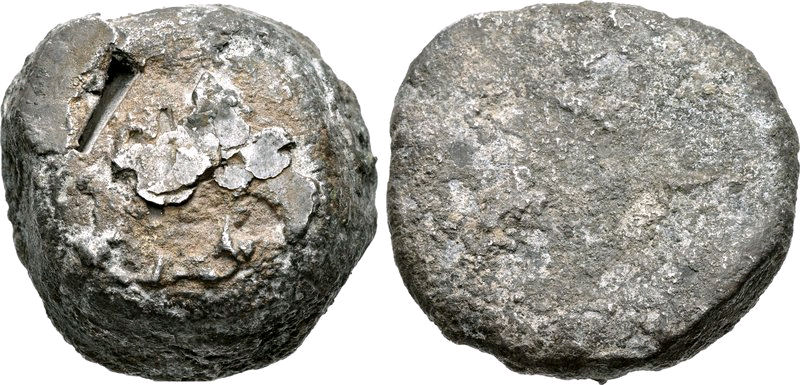
Achaemenid period silver ingot, Pushkalavati, Gandhara.

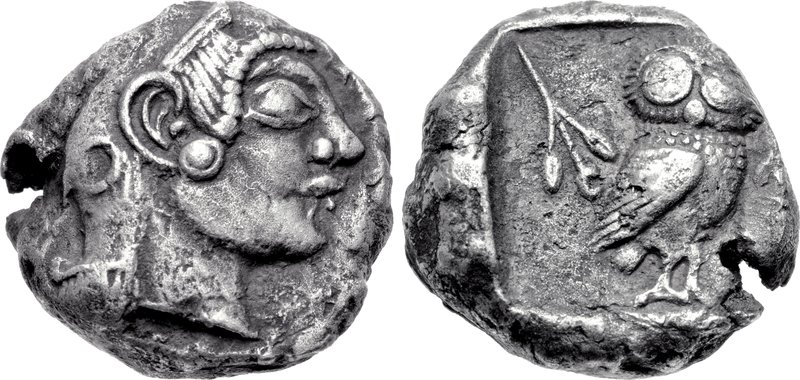
Athens coin (circa 500/490-485 BCE) discovered in Pushkalavati. This coin is the earliest known example of its type to be found so far east.

== See also ==
- Coinage of India
- Ghazzat hoard

== Bibliography ==
- Alram, Michael (2016), "The Coinage of the Persian Empire", in William E. Metcalf (ed.), The Oxford Handbook of Greek and Roman Coinage, Oxford University Press, pp. 61–, ISBN 9780199372188
- Bivar, Adrian David Hugh (1971), "Hoard of Ingot-Currency of the Median Period from Nūsh-i Jān, near Malayir", IRAN: Journal of the British Institute of Persian Studies, Volume IX, pp. 97–111
- Bopearachchi, Osmund (2000), "Coin Production and Circulation in Central Asia and North-West India (Before and after Alexander's Conquest)", Indologica Taurinensia, 25, International Association of Sanskrit Studies
- Bopearachchi, Osmund (2017), "Achaemenids and Mauryans: Emergence of Coins and Plastic Arts in India", in Alka Patel; Touraj Daryaee (eds.), India and Iran in the Longue Durée, UCI Jordan Center for Persian Studies, pp. 15–48
- Bopearachchi, Osmund; Cribb, Joe (1992), "Coins illustrating the History of the Crossroads of Asia", in Errington, Elizabeth; Cribb, Joe; Claringbull, Maggie (eds.), The Crossroads of Asia: transformation in image and symbol in the art of ancient Afghanistan and Pakistan, Ancient India and Iran Trust, pp. 56–59, ISBN 978-0-9518399-1-1
- Cribb, Joe (1983), "Investigating the introduction of coinage in India - A review of recent research", Journal of the Numismatic Society of India: 80–101
- Cribb, J. (1985), "Dating India's Earliest Coins", in J. Schotsmans; M. Taddei (eds.), South Asian Archaeology, 1983: Proceedings from the Seventh International Conference of the Association of South Asian Archaeologistan in Westeren Europe Held in the Musees Royaux d'art et d'histoire, Brussels, Naples: Istituto Universario Orientale, pp. 535–554
- Eggermont, Pierre Herman Leonard (1975), Alexander's Campaigns in Sind and Baluchistan and the Siege of the Brahmin Town of Harmatelia, Peeters Publishers, ISBN 978-90-6186-037-2
- Oliver, Graham (2013), "Coinage", in Nigel Wilson (ed.), Encyclopedia of Ancient Greece, Routledge, ISBN 978-1-136-78800-0
- Kagan, J. (2009), "Archaic Greek Coins East of the Tigris: Evidence for Circulation" (PDF), Proceedings of the XIVth International Numismatic Congress, Glasgow, pp. 230–234
- Goyal, Shankar (1999), "The Origin and Antiquity of Coinage in India", Annals of the Bhandarkar Oriental Research Institute, 80 (1/4): 125–154, JSTOR 41694581
- Magee, Peter; Petrie, Cameron; Knox, Richard; Khan, Farid; Thomas, Ken (2005), "The Achaemenid Empire in South Asia and Recent Excavations in Akra in Northwest Pakistan", American Journal of Archaeology, 109 (4): 711–741, doi:10.3764/aja.109.4.711, S2CID 54089753
- Olmstead, A. T. (1948), History of the Persian Empire, University of Chicago Press, ISBN 978-0-226-62777-9
