= Bamboo tally =

Historic alternative currency of China

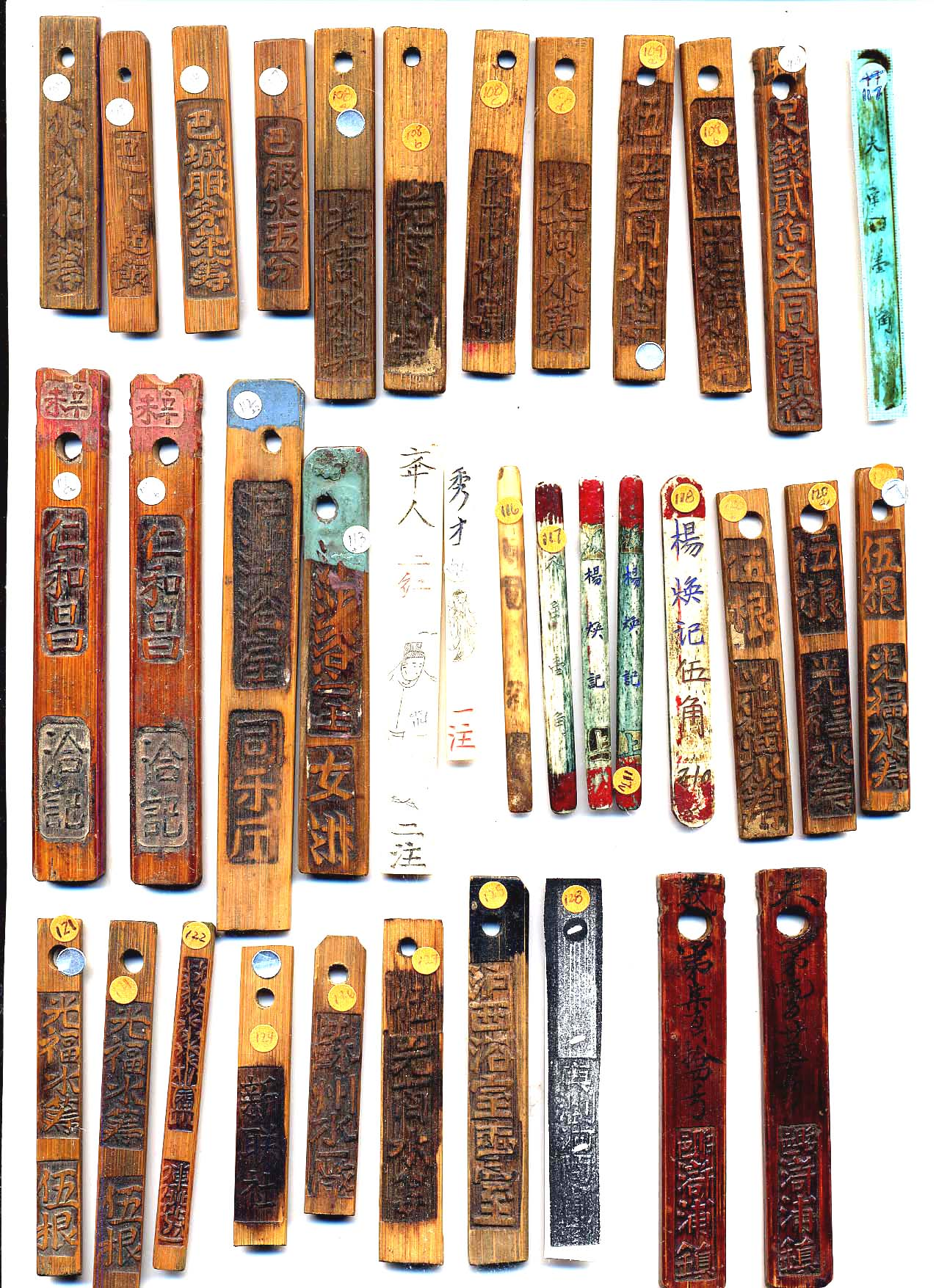
Different types of bamboo tallies.

Bamboo tallies (Traditional Chinese: 錢籌; Simplified Chinese: 钱筹; Pinyin: qián chóu), alternatively known as bamboo tokens or bamboo money, were a type of alternative currency that was produced in Eastern China (primarily in the provinces of Shandong, Jiangsu, and Zhejiang often around the cities of Suzhou and Wuxi) from the 1870s until the 1940s and were used to supplement Chinese cash coins and other small denomination Chinese currencies in a manner similar to paper money. Some bamboo tallies were issued in denominations of wén (文) or "strings of cash coins" (串), some bamboo tallies were denominated in qián (錢), tóngyuán (銅元, machine-struck coins of 10 wén), jiǎo (角), and yáng (洋, foreign silver coins), other than in money bamboo tallies could also be denominated in tea bags. During the same time as bamboo tallies were issued other local businesses manufactured paper money denominated in fēn (分) while others used either copper tokens or money made from bones in a similar fashion.

== Emergency money ==
Bamboo tallies were used due to the loss of authority by the Qing government that caused a shortage in currency and a loss of trust in the government. They continued to be used during the turbulent period of the Republic of China, as many local private banks at the time suffered from shortages of coinage. These banks consequently issued their own currencies as a provisional measure. Bamboo tallies continued to be used in China up until the 1960s. In addition to local private banks, bamboo tallies were also issued by local business and trading firms, exchange-offices, merchant guilds or associations, as well as playhouses. Other producers included the Jiheyi Society (a local producer of rice), the Deyuan Society (a local mat manufacturer), and the Xuyichang candy shop. The first bamboo tallies from this region were actually manufactured during the Southern Song dynasty, but modern bamboo tallies were only produced in the aftermath of the Taiping Rebellion as it had devastated the local economy. They were originally produced by mat-manufacturers of Xushuan in 1877 under the Guangxu Emperor as "emergency money", and had a nominal value of 100 wén. These early bamboo tallies were initially meant to be used between their suppliers and customers from the countryside, but they began to circulate on the entire market, a practice which was not prohibited by local authorities due to the contemporary economic situation of the region. From 1895 onwards, local governments of these regions began to officially condone and later issue these bamboo tallies themselves. Several factors such as the Kuomintang takeover of China and subsequent Japanese invasion of China meant that these tokens would remain a popular medium of exchange as these events negatively affected the local economy.

== Manufacture ==
Bamboo tallies were manufactured from bamboo from coastal China; to make these tallies, the skin of the bamboo was removed and then the stalk would be cut into rectangles that would have a hole drilled at the top. On the obverse side the denomination of the bamboo tally was placed and in uncommon cases the date of issue using the sexagenary cycle while on the reverse side an inked serial number (sometimes using Chinese numerals and sometimes using Arabic numerals) along with the name of the issuing bank of merchant would be placed. The sides of the bamboo tallies would often be inscribed with the manufacturing company and anti-counterfeit measures such as the statement "not compensated if lost" (失去不補, shī qù bù bǔ) and warranty marks are known as shing hao. After the tally was fully inscribed the bamboo would be lacquered in transparent light red to improve the durability of the tally.

== See also ==
- Bamboo and wooden slips
- Chinese token (alternative currency)
- Qing dynasty coinage
- Tally stick
