= Countermark =

Type of coin

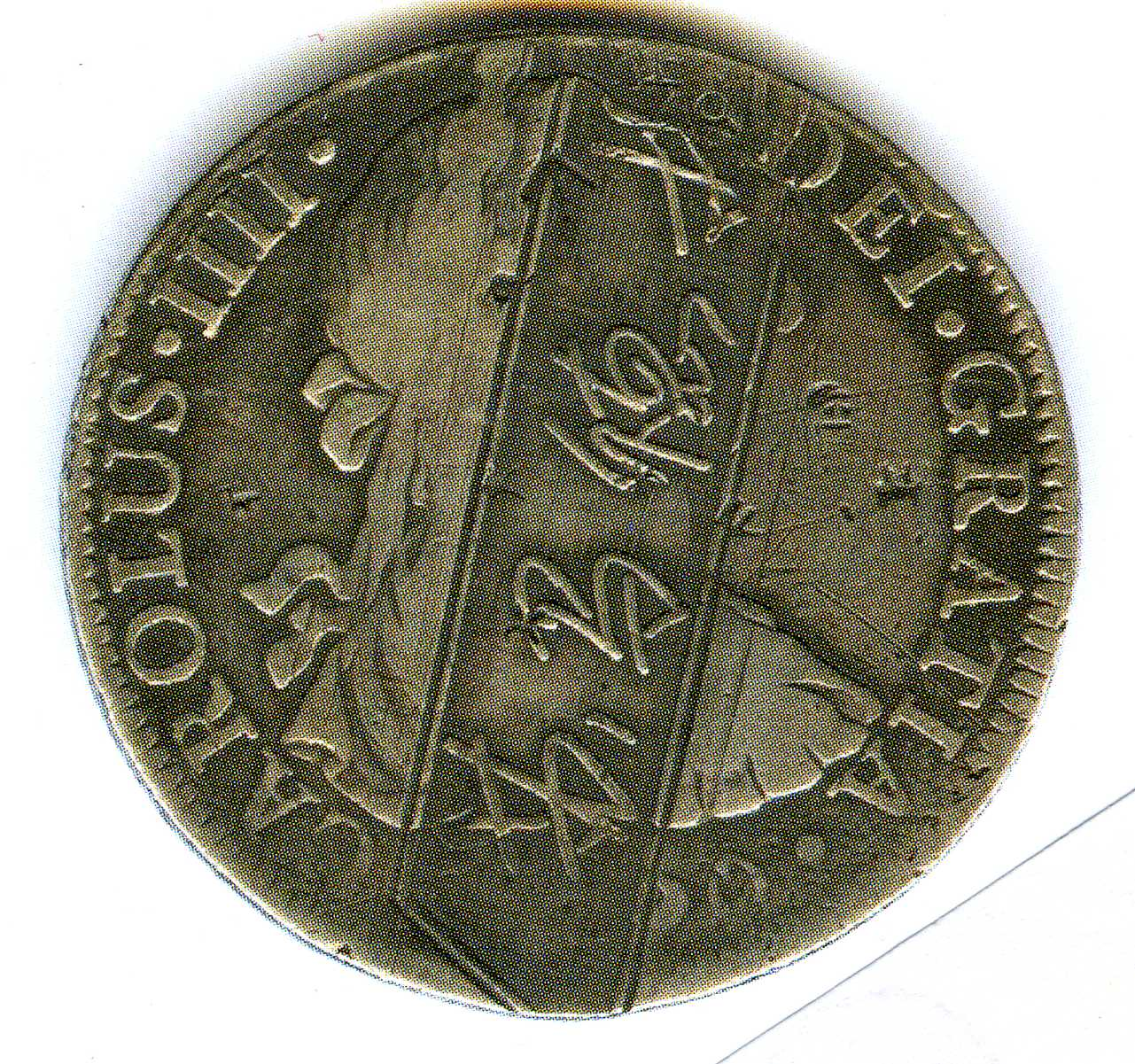
A silver coin of Charles IV of Spain, countermarked for local use by Chinese merchants in Sumatra (苏马德拉), also known as a chop mark

A countermarked, or punchmarked or counterstamped coin, is a coin that has had some additional mark or symbol punched into it at some point after it was originally produced while in circulation. This practice is now obsolete.

Countermarking can be done for a variety of reasons. If the currency is reformed, existing coins may be rendered void. In this situation, coins already in circulation could be marked with the new value (according to the new currency system). The life span of existing coins could thus be extended, which might under some circumstances be a cheaper alternative to recalling the coins, melting them and striking replacements. Similarly, foreign coins could be marked as legal or accepted currency, thus allowing them to circulate in the area where they were countermarked.

Countermarking can also be done for political reasons, i.e. a new state or régime demonstrating its authority by countermarking coins issued by the previous state. Some experts recommend not to use the term countermark and counterstamp as synonyms, but in different contexts.

A counterstamp is applied by a die, and by machine to an existing coin, while a countermark is punched onto the coin, mostly by hand, using a punch and a hammer or a primitive hand-operated machine. Often countermarks are applied by private persons, as is the case with chops (often referred to as chopmarks), which were punched by money changers, bankers or shroffs onto foreign coins circulating in China in the 19th century. In contrast the use of counterstamps should be authorized by a local or national Government. An example of this would be post WWI in now modern day Germany to show hyperinflation.

The term punchmark is mainly used when referring to the earliest Indian silver coins which are coin-like pieces of metal of a standard weight that are bearing various symbols which were applied with punches, resulting in what are known as punchmarked coins.

== Examples ==
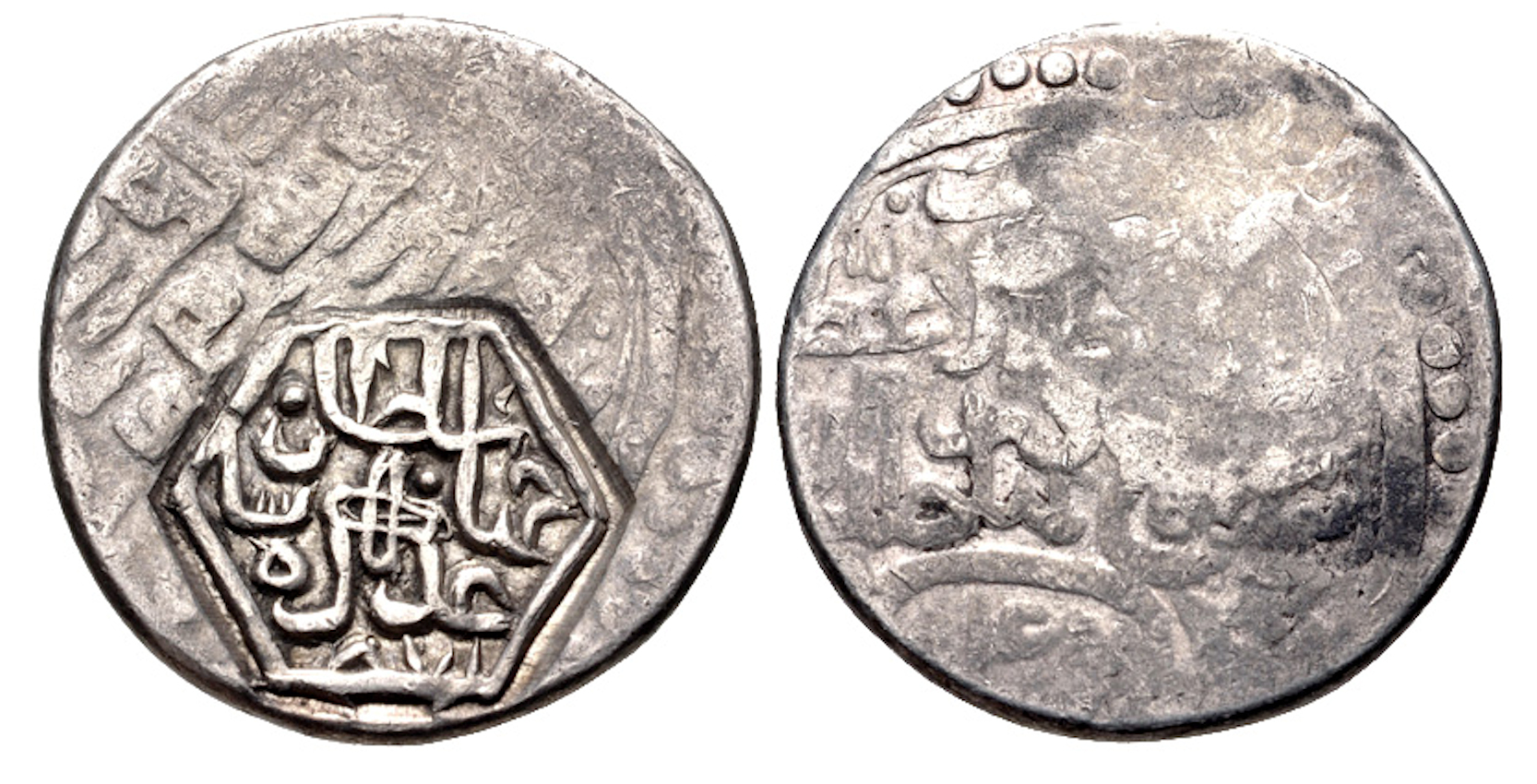
Countermarked issue of the Qara Qoyunlu ruler Jahan Shah, c. 1466/7

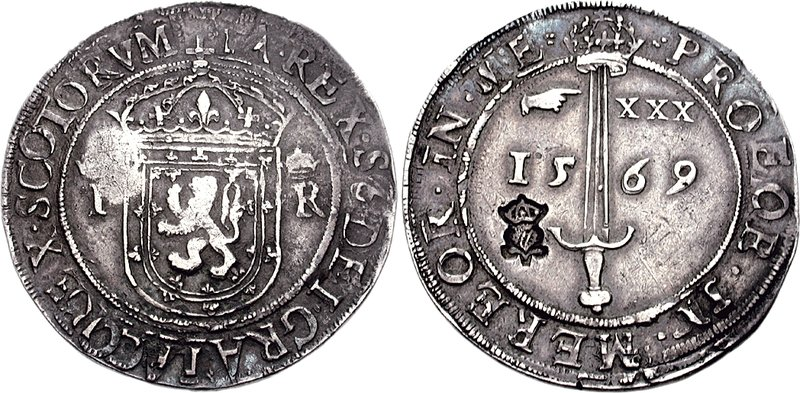
Silver ryal of James VI of Scotland, with thistle countermark to mark the recoinage of 1577

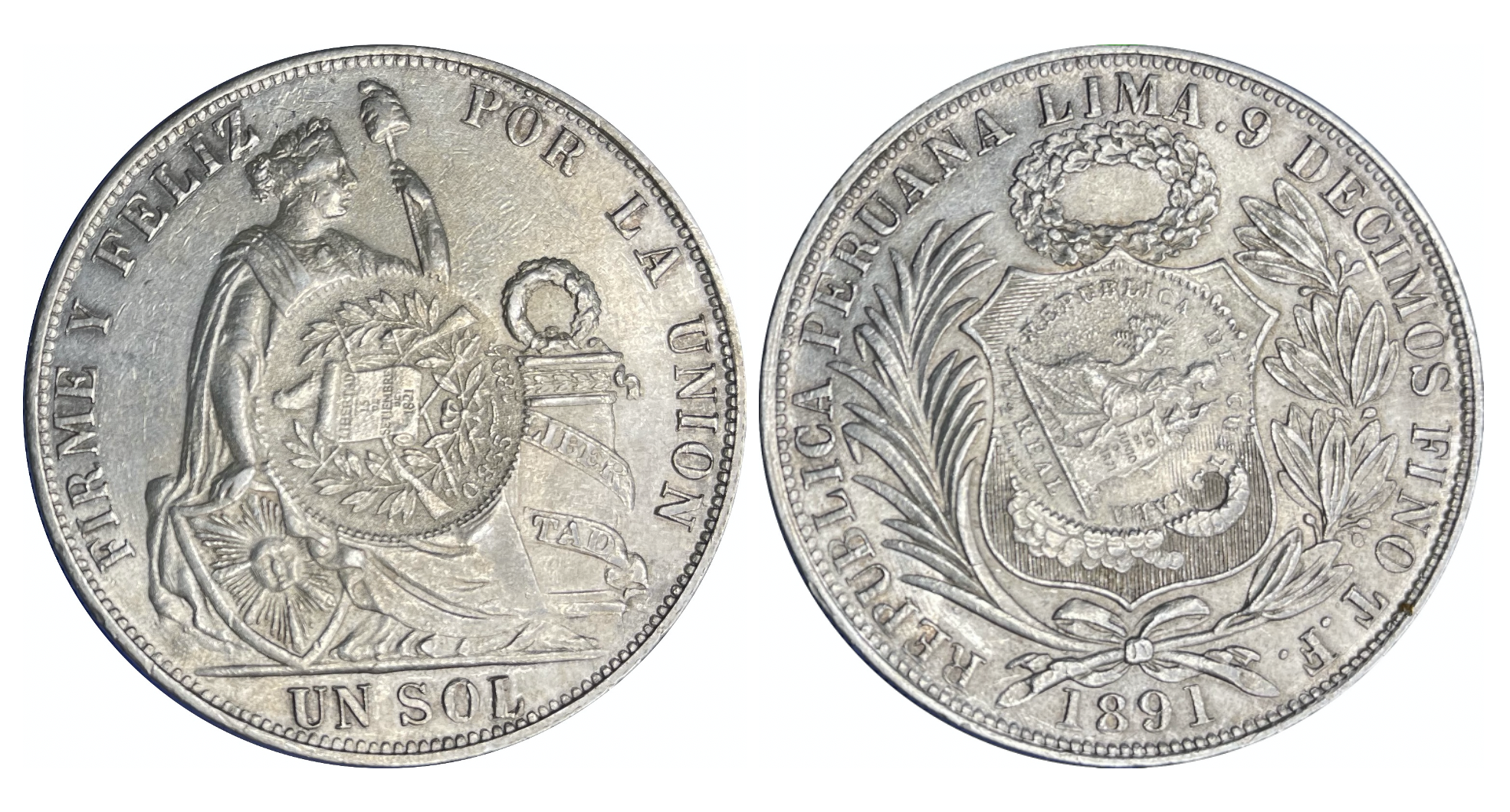
1 Peruvian sol converts to 1 Guatemalan peso – 1891 TF

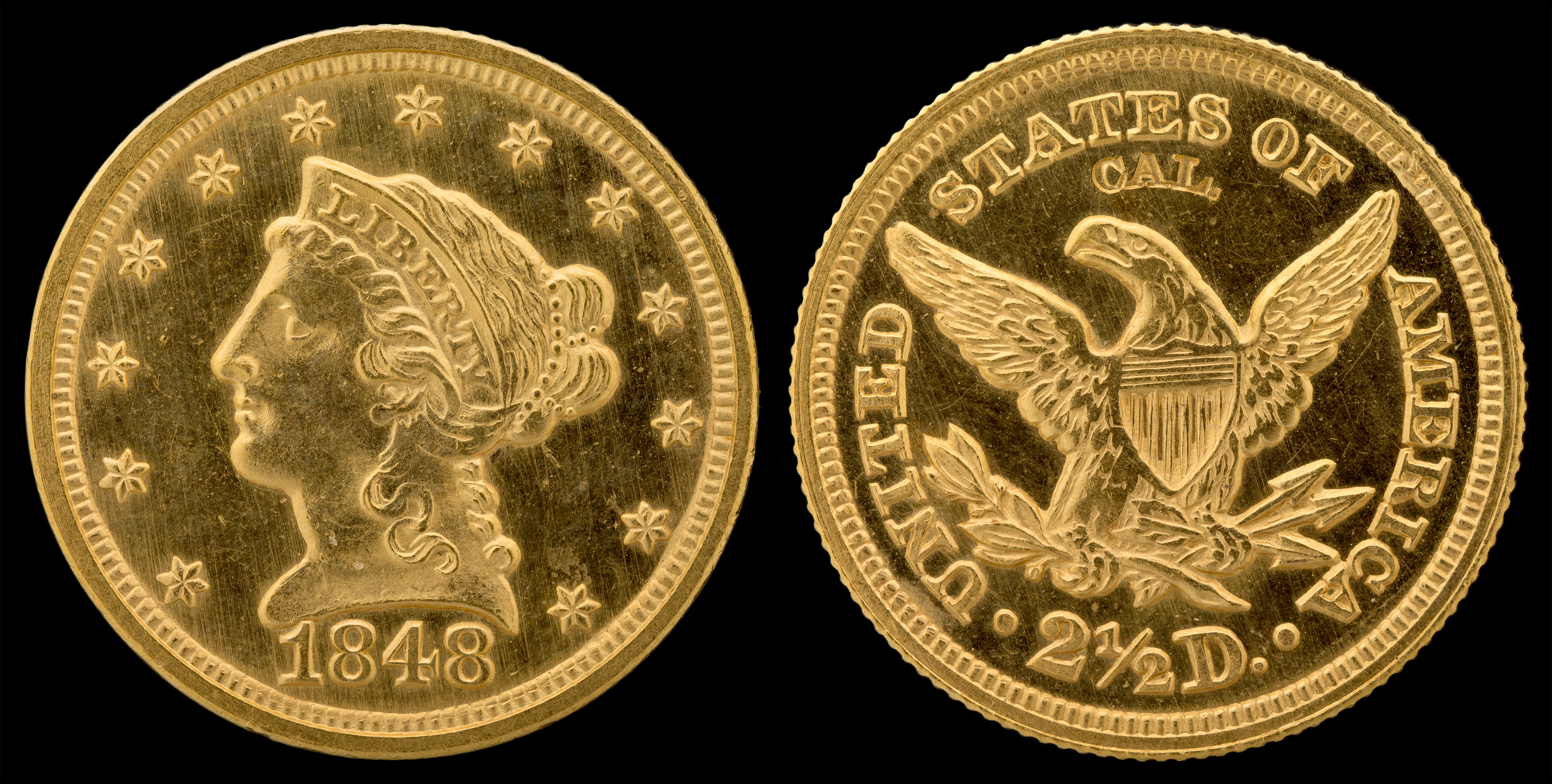
An 1848 gold quarter eagle with a punchmark reading "CAL" on its reverse

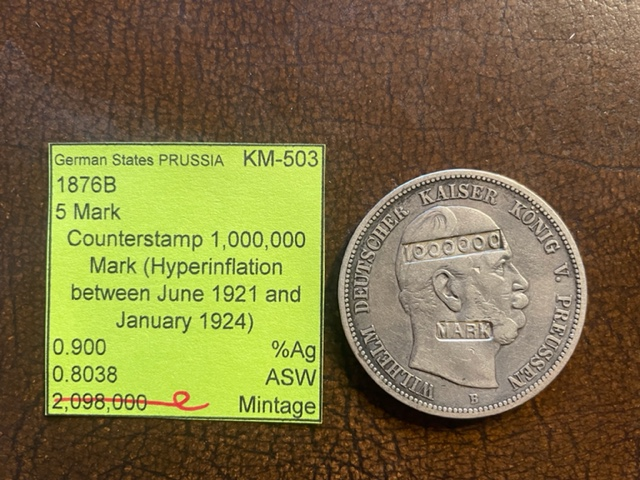
A 5 Mark coin counterstamp to show the value of 1,000,000 Mark

== See also ==
- Overstrike (numismatics) — where a new design is struck over an existing coin
- Chop marks on coins
- Counterfeit
- Punch-marked coins
- Overprints, a printed equivalent to a countermark, found on banknotes or stamps
