= Punch-marked coins =

Ancient Indian coinage

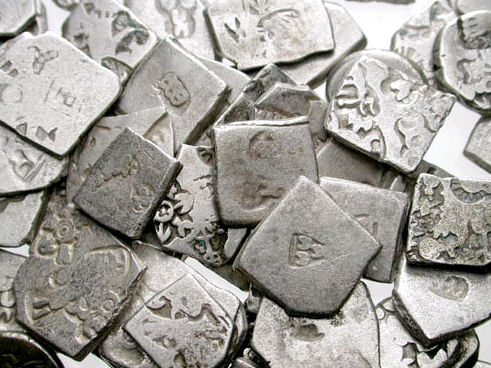
A hoard of mostly Mauryan punch-marked coins

Punch-marked coins were a type of karshapana or Ancient Indian coinage, also known as Aahat (stamped) coins, dating to between about the 6th and 2nd centuries BC. It was of irregular shape. These coins are found over most parts of subcontinent and remained in circulation till the early centuries CE.

== History ==
=== Janapada Coins ===
The study of the relative chronology of these coins has successfully established that the first punch-marked coins initially only had one or two punches, with the number of punches increasing over time. 19th-century proposals suggesting an origin from as early as 1000 BC, independent of the introduction of coins in Asia Minor, are "no longer given any credence".

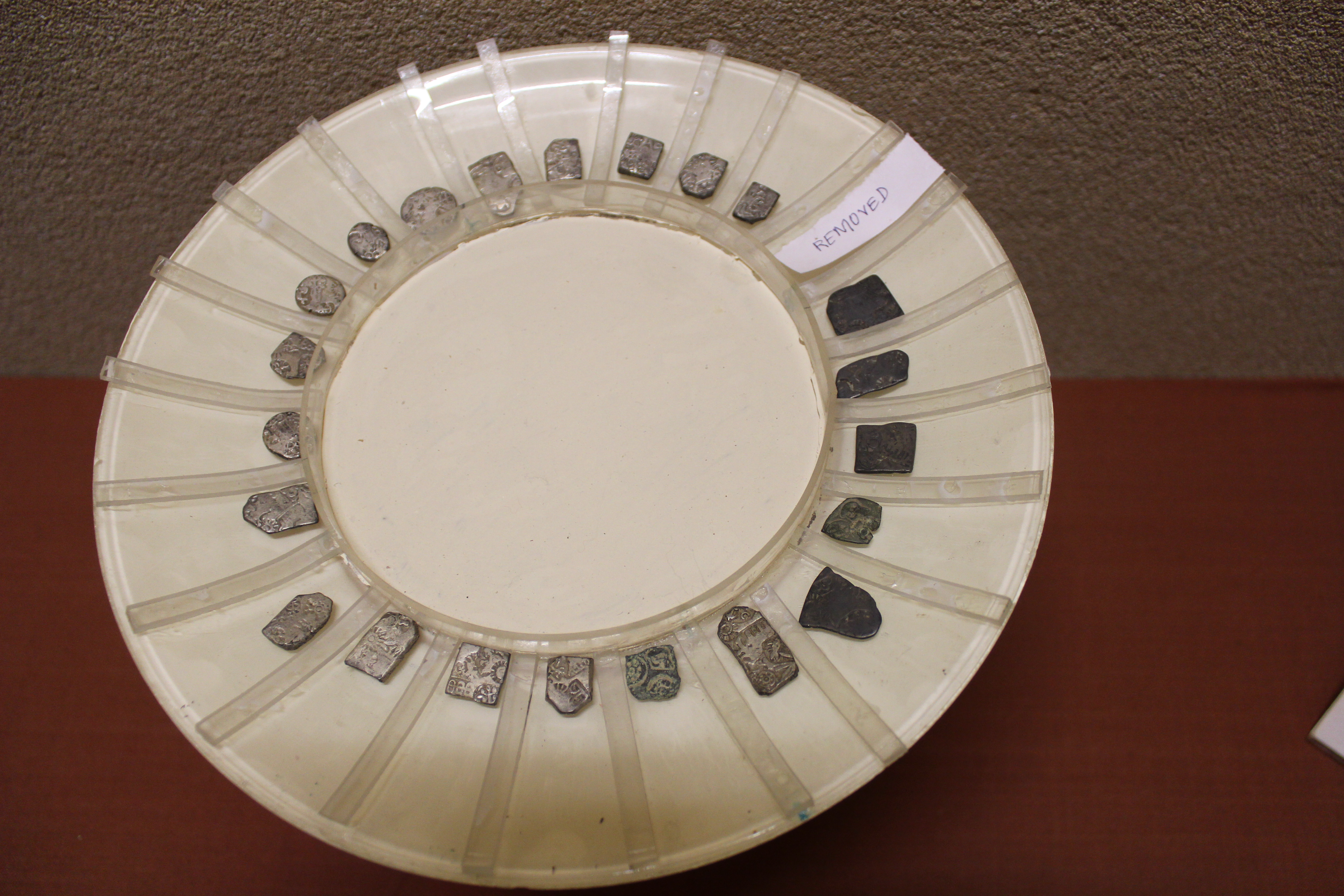
Punch-marked coins discovered from Chandraketugarh.

According to Osmund Bopearachchi, the first punch-marked coins in the Indian Subcontinent may have been minted around the 6th century BC by the Mahajanapadas of the Indo-Gangetic Plain. These coins were produced by impressing single punches individually. According to E. J. Rapson, the earliest punch-marked coins were "karshapana" produced by early Indian kingdoms and tribes before foreign influence. The earliest coins in the subcontinent were bent bar coins with punched impressions. Mahajanpadas were issuing coins called "satamana".

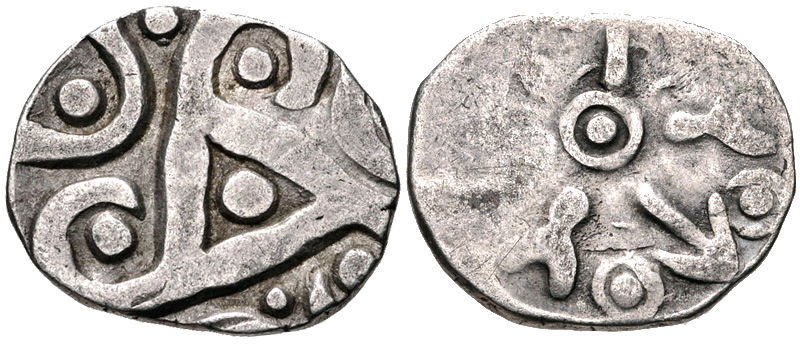
"Babyal Hoard" type, of the Kuru Janapada (350–315 BCE)

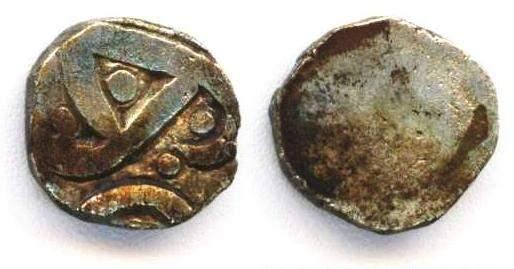
Silver, ½ Karshapana coin, “Babyal Hoard” type, of the Kuru Janapada (450–315 BC)

The Kuru kingdom minted punched coins, evidenced by their discovery in excavations of the Babyal Hoard near Sugh Ancient Mound, in present day Haryana. The coins of the Babyal Hoard had a triskelion-like design punched into them.

The Gandhara Janapada issued stamped bent bar coins prior to the Achaemenid Era. These coins were found mixed along with standard Persian and Greek coins (likely still circulating during Achaemenid rule) in the Bhir Mound.

In his work Aṣṭādhyāyī (350 BCE), Pāṇini categorized ancient Indian coins as Karshapana, either marked or unmarked (punched), and punch-marked coins called Aahat. Several of these coins had a single symbol. For example, coins from Saurashtra had a humped bull, while those of Dakshin Panchala had a swastika. Others, like from Magadha, had several symbols. These coins were of a standard weight but irregular shape, formed by cutting up silver bars and shaving the edges to the desired weight.

=== Achaemenid and Greek coinage (6th century onward) ===
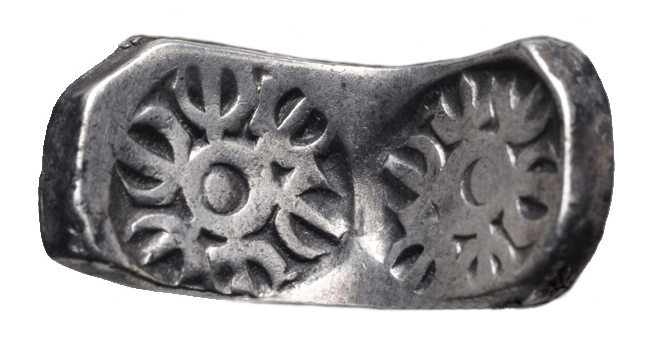
"Bent bar" of the Gandhara Janapda unearthed with Achaemenid and Greek coins, Gandhara, c.350 BC.

Silver coins were being produced in the Achaemenid Satrapy of Gandāra by the mid-4th century BC. As noted by Plutarch, Taxiles (Ambhi) of Taxila exchanged coined tribute with Alexander the Great.

Coin finds in the Kabul hoard (c. 380 BC), Mir Zakah hoards (c. 100 AD), Bhir Mound (c. 300 BC), or the Shaikhan Dehri hoard near Pushkalavati included Achaemenid coins as well as many Greek coins from the 5th and 4th centuries BC. This shows that the coins were circulating at least as far as the Indus during the reign of the Achaemenids (549 - 330 BCE), who controlled the areas as far as Gandhara. In 2007, a small coin hoard was discovered at the site of ancient Pushkalavati (Shaikhan Dehri) in Pakistan. The hoard contained a tetradrachm minted in Athens c. 500-480 BC, along with a number of local coins and cast silver ingots. The Athens coin is the earliest known example of its type to be found so far to the east. The Mir Zakah hoards offered several hundred thousand examples of punched and stamped bars and coins, manufactured between the late-5th century BC and late-1st century AD.

Daniel Schlumberger believes that punch-marked bars, similar to the many punch-marked bars found in northwestern India, initially originated in the Achaemenid Empire, rather than in the Indian heartland:

“The punch-marked bars were up to now considered to be Indian (...) However, the weight standard is considered by some experts to be Persian, and now that we see them also being uncovered in the soil of Afghanistan, we must take into account the possibility that their country of origin should not be sought beyond the Indus, but rather in the oriental provinces of the Achaemenid Empire"

— Daniel Schlumberger, quoted from Trésors Monétaires, p.42.

=== Mauryan Period (322–185 BC) and Post Mauryan periods ===
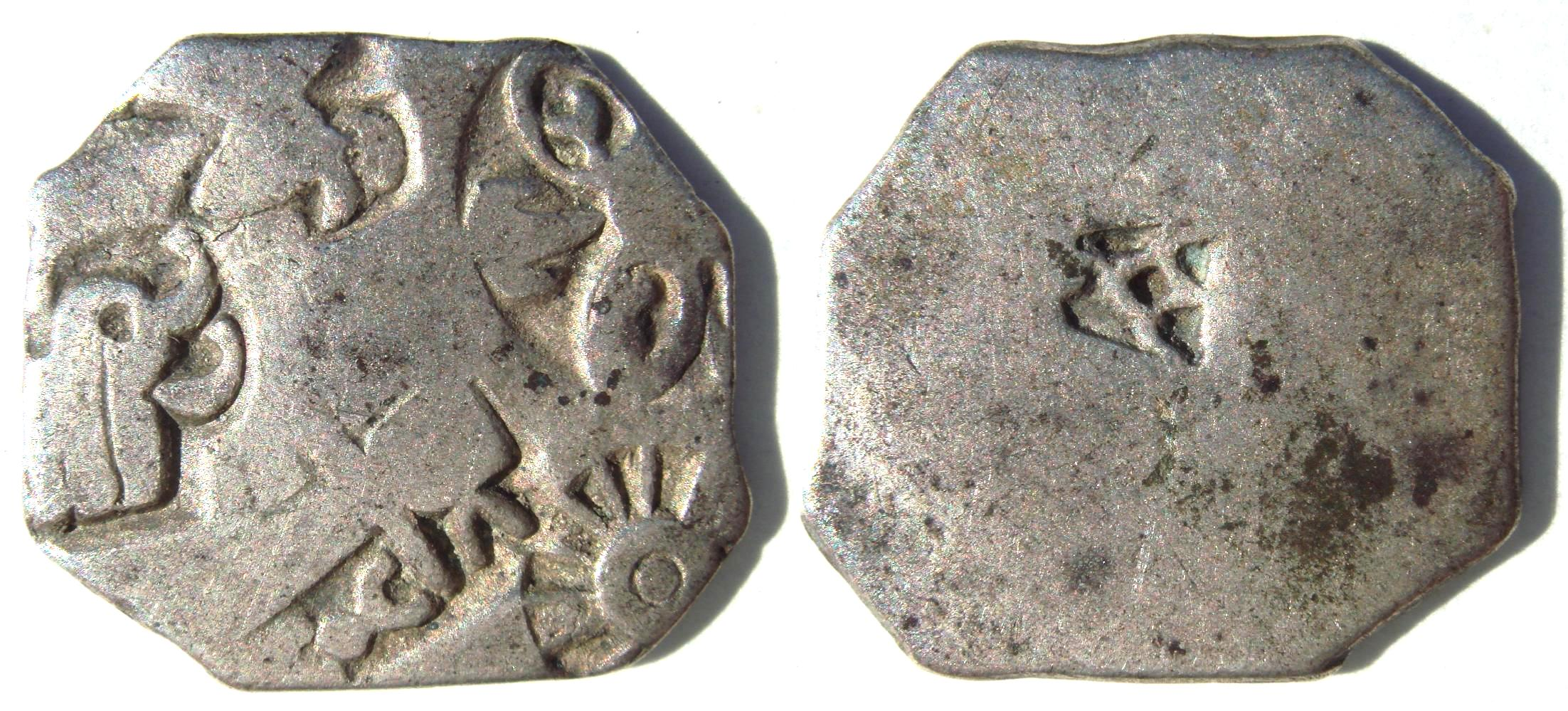
Punch-marked coin of the Nanda dynasty of Magadha. The five symbols on this coin are: Sun symbol, six-armed (Magadha) symbol, bull on hilltop, Indradhvaja flanked by four taurines, elephant. There's also an unofficial countermark on the reverse.

During the Mauryan period, punch-marked coins continued to be issued in large quantities. Similarly, the coinage of the Mauryan Empire was an example of the punch-marked coinage of Magadha. Each coin contained on average 50–54 grains of silver (depending on wear) and weighed 32 rattis, with earlier coins being flatter than later coins. There are 450 punch types, the most common being the sun and six-armed symbols, and including various forms of geometrical patterns, circles, wheels, human figures, animals, bows and arrows, and hills and trees.

In the North, following the fall of the Maurya Empire and the increased influence of the Greco-Bactrians and Indo-Greeks, punch-marked coins were replaced by cast die-struck coins, as visible in the Post-Mauryan coinage of Gandhara.

Punch marked coins are mentioned in the Manu Smriti (c. 200 BC - 200 AD), and Buddhist Jataka (c. 300 BC - 400 AD) as circulating in the North until approximately the beginning of 1 AD, and lasting three centuries longer in the South until about 300 AD.

- Shurasena
- Surashtra
  - Early coins of India (400 BC – 100 AD) were made of silver and copper, and bore animal and plant symbols on them.

== See also ==
- Overstrike (numismatics) — where a new design is struck over an existing coin
- Chop marks on coins
- Countermark
- Counterfeit
- Nandipada
