= Ghazzat hoard =

Hoard of Greek and Lycian silver

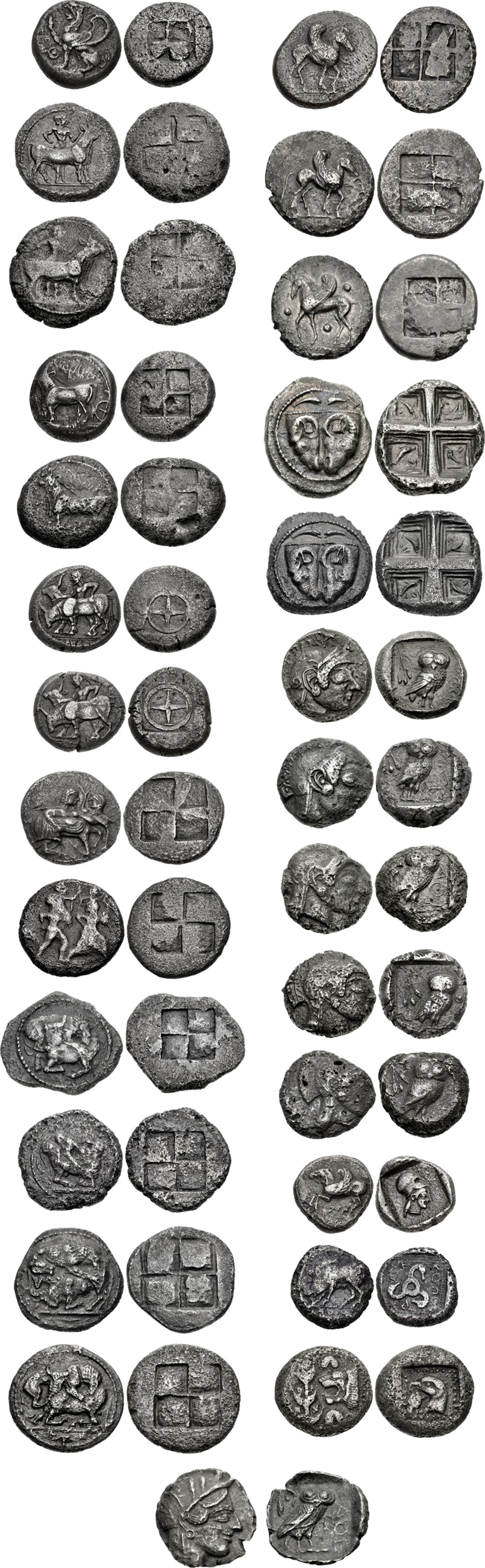
The Ghazzat hoard.

The Ghazzat hoard or Gaza hoard is a hoard of about 30 Archaic and early Classical Greek and Lycian silver coins discovered underwater near the shore of Gaza, Palestine.

The coins belong to a rather narrow period, from the end of the 6th century BCE, to the first quarter of the 5th century BCE (circa 510-475 BCE). The suggested deposition date for the entire hoard is circa 480 BCE.

There is a large proportion of Macedonian, Thracian and Chalcidian coins in the hoard, the presence of which is considered as a consequence of the invasion of the Balkans by the Achaemenid Empire between 514-479 BCE. Alternatively, they may have diffused mainly after the Greco-Persian wars.

== See also ==
- Kabul hoard
- Achaemenid coinage
