= Ancient Greek coinage =

Greek coins from the Archaic to Imperial Roman periods

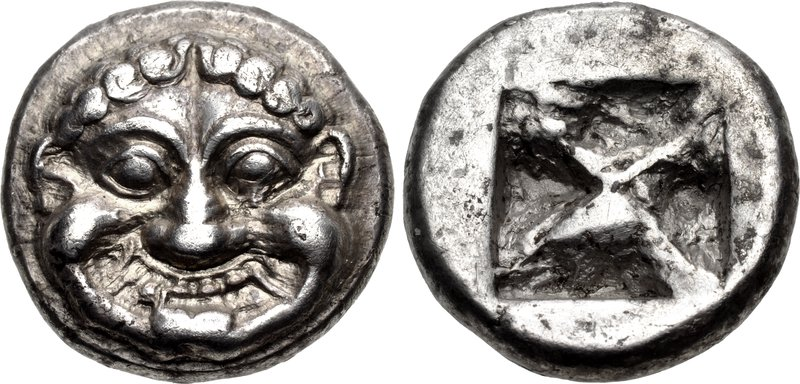
The earliest coinage of Athens, a "Wappenmünzen" didrachm struck c. 545-525/515 BC

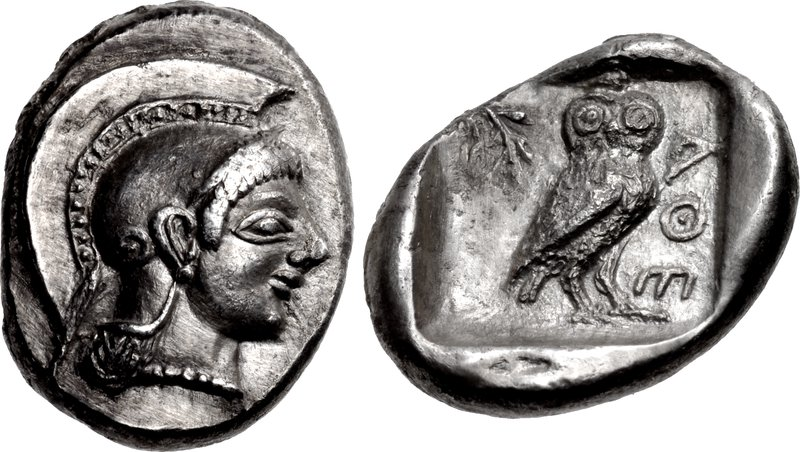
Archaic drachm of Athens with effigy of Athena on the obverse, and olive sprig, owl and ΑΘΕ, initials of "Athens" on the reverse. Struck c. 510-500/490 BC

The history of ancient Greek coinage can be divided (along with most other Greek art forms) into four periods: the Archaic, the Classical, the Hellenistic and the Roman. The Archaic period extends from the introduction of coinage to the Greek world during the 7th century BC until the Persian Wars in about 480 BC. The Classical period then began, and lasted until the conquests of Alexander the Great in about 330 BC, which began the Hellenistic period, extending until the Roman absorption of the Greek world in the 1st century BC. The Greek cities continued to produce their own coins for several more centuries under Roman rule. The coins produced during this period are called Roman provincial coins or Greek imperial coins.

== Weight standards and denominations ==
Denominations of silver coinage according to the Attic standard
Image	Denomination	Value	Weight
	Decadrachm	10 drachmae	~43 grams
	Tetradrachm	4 drachmae	~17.2 grams
	Didrachm	2 drachmae	~8.6 grams
	Drachma	6 obols	~4.3 grams
	Tetrobol	4 obols	~2.85 grams
	Hemidrachm (triobol)	3 obols	~2.15 grams
	Diobol	2 obols	~1.43 grams
	Trihemiobol	1½ obols	~1.08 grams
	Obol	4 tetartemorions	~0.72 grams
	Tritartemorion	3 tetartemorions	~0.54 grams
	Hemiobol	2 tetartemorions	~0.36 grams
	Trihemitetartemorion	1 1/2 tetartemorions	~0.27 grams
	Tetartemorion	1/4 obol	~0.18 grams
	Hemitetartemorion	1/2 tetartemorion	~0.09 grams

The three most important standards of the ancient Greek monetary system were the Attic standard, based on the Athenian drachma of 4.3 grams (2.8 pennyweights) of silver, the Corinthian standard based on the stater of 8.6 g (5.5 dwt) of silver, that was subdivided into three silver drachmas of 2.9 g (1.9 dwt), and the Aeginetan stater or didrachm of 12.2 g (7.8 dwt), based on a drachma of 6.1 g (3.9 dwt). The words drachm and drachma come from Ancient Greek δραχμά (drachmā́), an older form of δραχμή (drachmḗ), meaning 'a handful', or literally 'a grasp'. Drachmae were divided into six obols (from the Greek word for a spit), and six spits made a "handful". This suggests that before coinage came to be used in Greece, spits in prehistoric times were used as measures in daily transactions. In archaic, pre-numismatic times iron was valued for making durable tools and weapons, and its casting in spit form may have actually represented a form of transportable bullion, which eventually became bulky and inconvenient after the adoption of precious metals. Because of this very aspect, Spartan legislation famously forbade issuance of Spartan coin, and enforced the use of iron ingots, called pelanoi in order to discourage avarice and the hoarding of wealth. In addition to its original meaning (which also gave the diminutive "obelisk", "little spit"), the word obol (ὀβολός, obolós, or ὀβελός, obelós) was retained as a Greek word for coins of small value, still used as such in Modern Greek slang (όβολα, óvola, "monies").

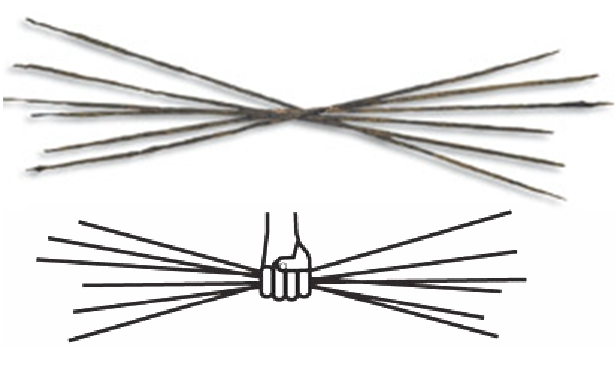
Above: Six rod-shaped obeloi (oboloi) displayed at the Numismatic Museum of Athens, discovered at Heraion of Argos. Below: grasp of six oboloi forming one drachma

The obol was further subdivided into tetartemorioi (singular tetartemorion) which represented 1/4 obol, or 1/24 drachm. This coin (which was known to have been struck in Athens, Colophon, and several other cities) is mentioned by Aristotle as the smallest silver coin. Various multiples of this denomination were also struck, including the trihemitetartemorion (literally three half-tetartemorioi) valued at 3/8 of an obol.

== Archaic period (until about 480 BC) ==
Archaic coinage

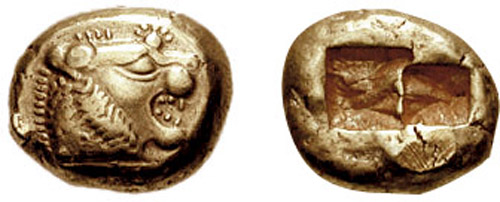
Uninscribed electrum third stater from Lydia, early 6th century BC. Obverse: lion head and sunburst Reverse: plain square imprints, probably used to standardise weight

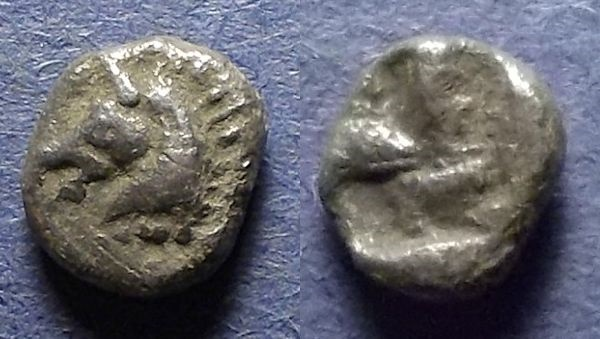
Ionia, Uncertain city (possibly Kyme, Aeolis) 600–550 BC, Hemiobol. Horse head, rough incuse.

The earliest known coins are Lydian and East Greek coins found under the Temple of Artemis at Ephesus, dated to around 640 BC. These coins were issued either by the non-Greek Lydians for their own use or perhaps because Greek mercenaries wanted to be paid in precious metal, and wanted to have their payments marked in a way that would authenticate them. These coins were made of electrum, an alloy of gold and silver that was highly prized and abundant in that area.

In the middle of the 6th century BC, King Croesus replaced the electrum coins with coins of pure gold and pure silver, called Croeseids. Herodotus credits the Lydians with inventing pure gold and silver coinage:

So far as we have any knowledge, they [the Lydians] were the first people to introduce the use of gold and silver coins, and the first who sold goods by retail.

— Herodotus, I.94

Coins of Aegina

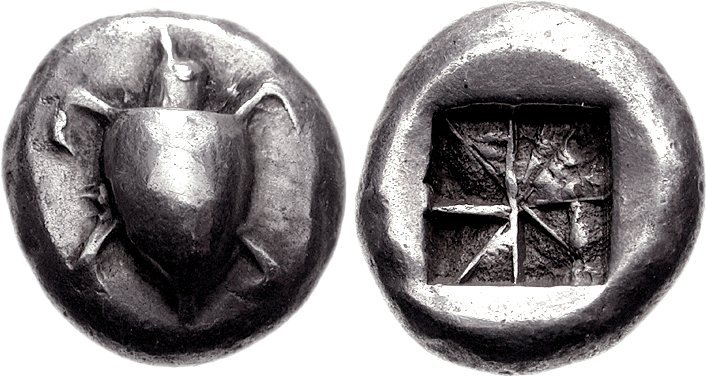
Silver stater of Aegina, 550-530 BC. Obv.: Sea turtle with large pellets down center. Rev. incuse square with eight sections. After the end of the Peloponnesian War, 404 BC, Sea turtle was replaced by the land tortoise.

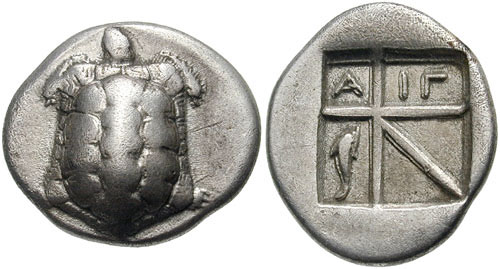
Silver drachma of Aegina, 404-340 BC. Obv.: Land tortoise. Rev. inscription: ΑΙΓ[ΙΝΑΤΟΝ] (of the Aeginetans) "Aegina" and dolphin.

The Greek world was divided into more than two thousand self-governing city-states (in Greek, poleis), and more than half of them issued their own coins. Some coins circulated widely beyond their polis, indicating that they were being used in inter-city trade; the first example appears to have been the silver stater or didrachm of Aegina that regularly turns up in hoards in Egypt and the Levant, places which were deficient in silver supply. As such coins circulated more widely, other cities began to mint coins to this "Aeginetan" weight standard of 6.1 g (3.9 dwt) to the drachm, other cities included their own symbols on the coins.

Athenian coins, however, were struck on the "Attic" standard, with a drachm equaling 4.3 g (2.8 dwt) of silver. Over time, Athens' plentiful supply of silver from the mines at Laurion and its increasing dominance in trade made this the pre-eminent standard. These coins were known as "owls" because of their central design feature. They were minted to an extremely tight standard of purity and weight; this contributed to their success as the premier trade coin of their era. Tetradrachms on this weight standard continued to be a widely used coin (often the most widely used) through the classical period. By the time of Alexander the Great and his Hellenistic successors, this large denomination was being regularly used to make large payments, or was saved for hoarding.

=== International circulation ===
Archaic Greek coinage seems to have had a very wide circulation in the Achaemenid Empire. Many of them were discovered in coin hoards throughout the Achaemenid Empire such as the Ghazzat hoard and the Apadana hoard, and also very far to the east, such as the Kabul hoard or the Pushkalavati hoard in Ancient India, following the Achaemenid conquest of the Indus Valley. Generally, Greek coins (both Archaic and early Classical) are comparatively very numerous in the Achaemenid coin hoards discovered in the east of the Achaemenid Empire, much more numerous than Sigloi, suggesting that the circulation of Greek coinage was central in the monetary system of those part of the empire.

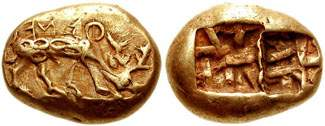
Electrum trite from Ephesus, 620-600 BC. Obv.: Stag grazing right, ΦΑΝΕΩΣ (retrograde). Rev.: Two incuse punches, each with raised intersecting lines.

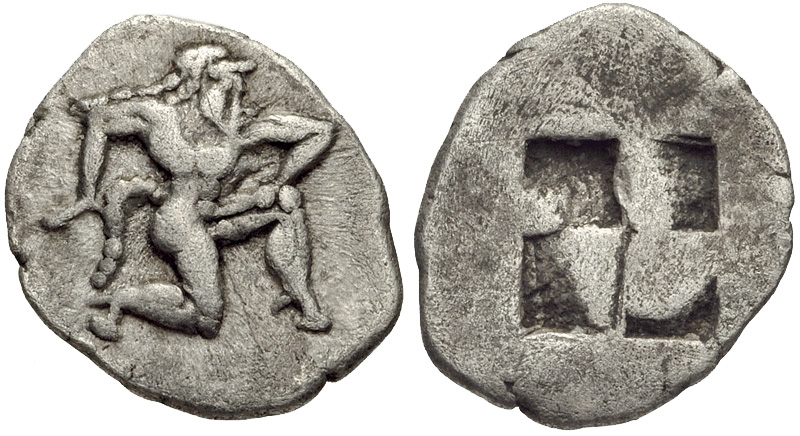
Archaic 1/8th stater of Thasos, c. 500-463 BC.

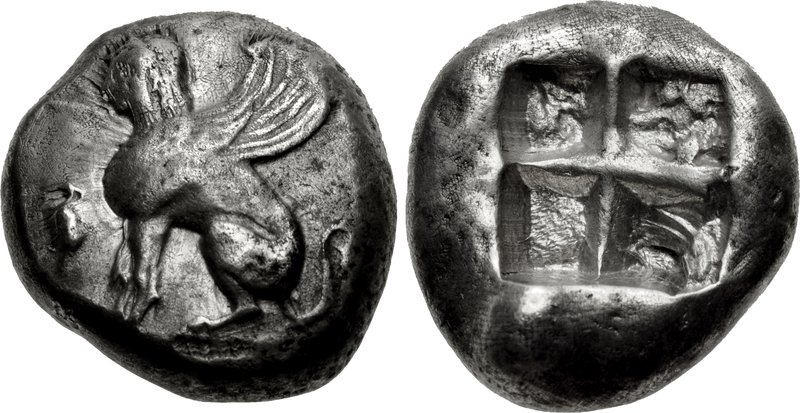
Archaic didrachm or stater of Chios, c. 490-435 BC. Earlier types known.

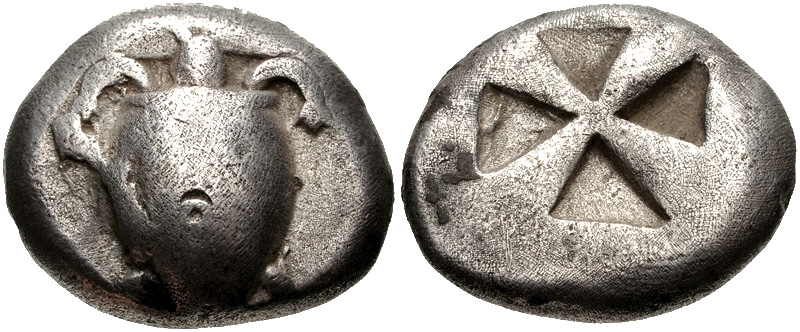
Archaic Aegina stater type, "windmill pattern" incuse punch. c. 510-490 BC.

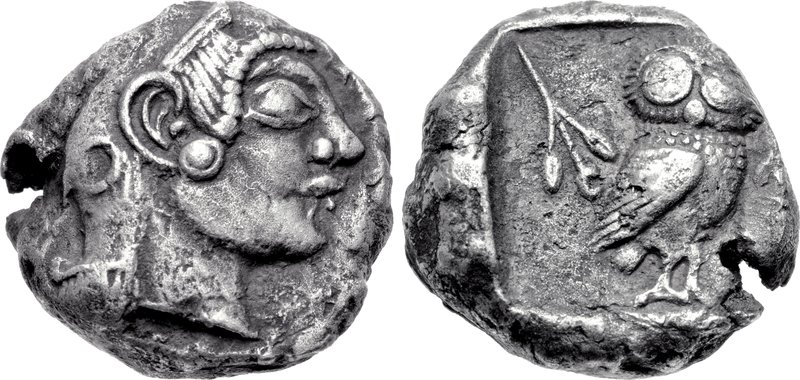
Athens tetradrachm (c. 500/490-485 BC) discovered in the Shaikhan Dehri hoard in Pushkalavati, Pakistan. This coin is the earliest known example of its type to be found so far east.

== Classical period (480–323 BC) ==
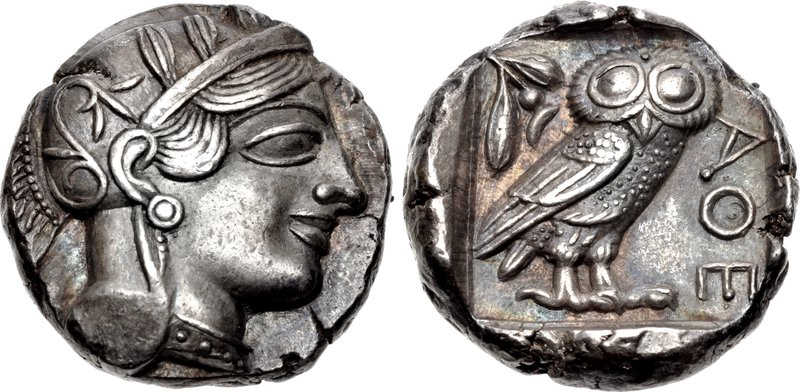
Tetradrachm of Athens
(c. 454-404 BC)
Obv.: head of Athena, patron goddess of the city, wearing Attic helmet
Rev.: the owl of Athens, with an olive sprig and the inscription ΑΘΕ[ΝΑΙΟΝ], "of the Athenians"

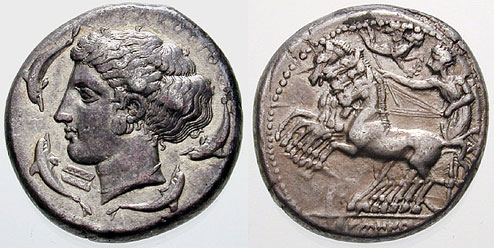
A Syracusan tetradrachm
(circa 415-405 BC)
Obv.: head of the nymph Arethusa, surrounded by four swimming dolphins and a rudder
Rev.: a racing quadriga, its charioteer crowned by the goddess Victory in flight.

The Classical period saw Greek coinage reach a high level of technical and aesthetic quality. Larger cities now produced a range of fine silver and gold coins, most bearing a portrait of their patron god or goddess or a legendary hero on one side, and a symbol of the city on the other. Some coins employed a visual pun: some coins from Rhodes featured a rose, since the Ancient Greek word for rose was rhodon. The use of inscriptions on coins also began, usually the name of the issuing city.

The wealthy cities of Sicily produced some especially fine coins, such as the silver decadrachm (10-drachm) coin from Syracuse signed by the prolific engravers Kimon and Euainetos. Syracusan issues were standard in their imprints, one side bearing the head of the nymph Arethusa and the other usually a victorious quadriga, as the tyrants of Syracuse used their wealth to fund quadrigas for chariots races at the Olympic games and other Greek competitions.

Amongst the first centers to produce coins during the Greek colonization of mainland Southern Italy (Magna Graecia) were Paestum, Crotone, Sybaris, Caulonia, Metapontum, and Taranto. These ancient cities started producing coins from 550 to 510 BC.

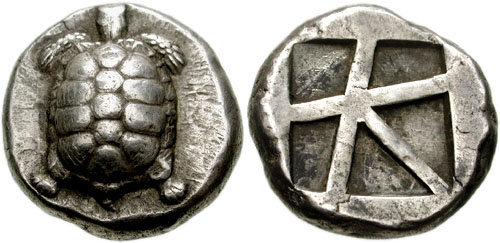
Aegina stater type, incuse skew pattern. Circa 456/445-431 BC.

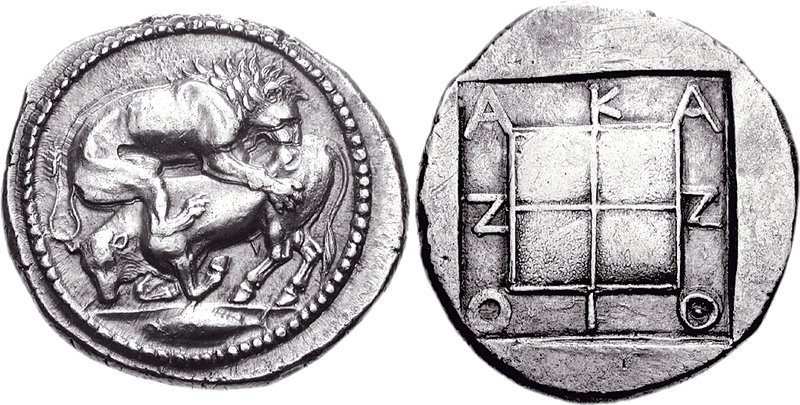
Tetradrachm of Akanthos, Macedon. Circa 470-430 BC.

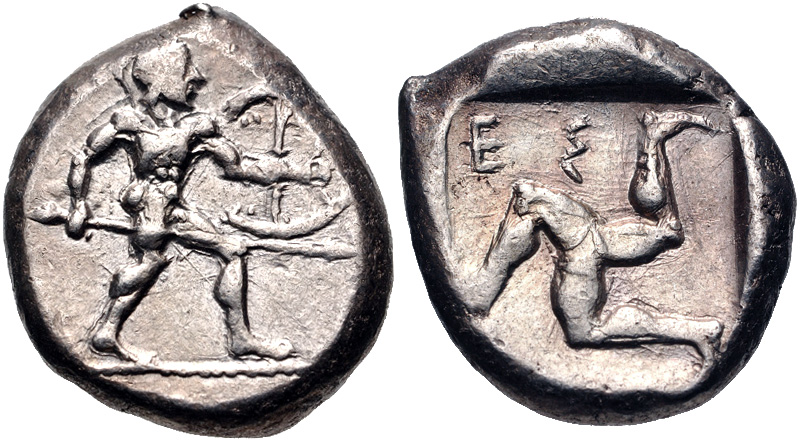
Stater of Aspendos, Pamphylia. Circa 465-430 BC.

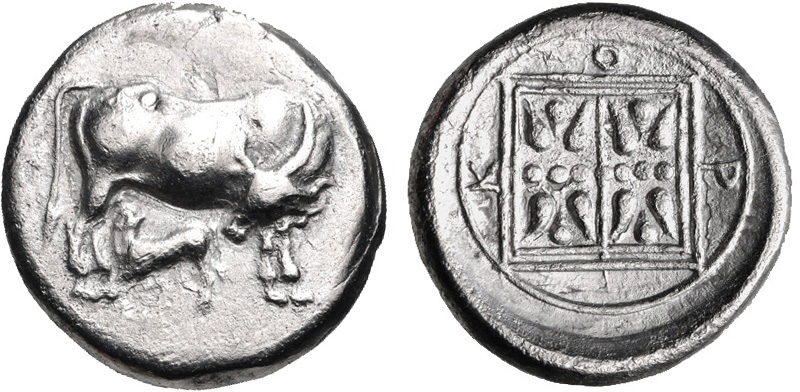
Stater from Korkyra. Circa 350/330-290/270 BC.

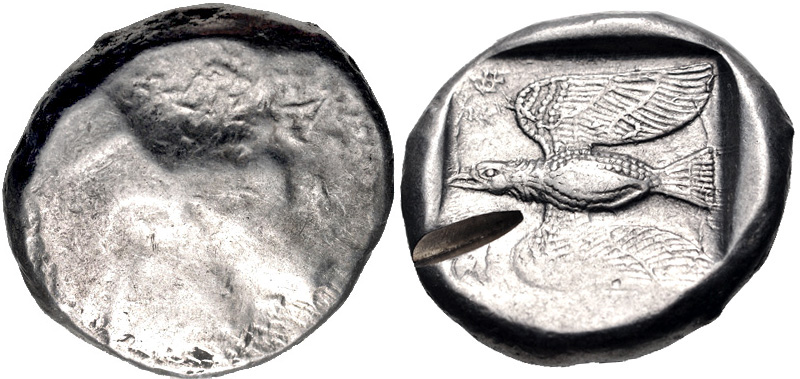
Stater of Cyprus, circa 450 BC.

== Hellenistic period (323–31 BC) ==
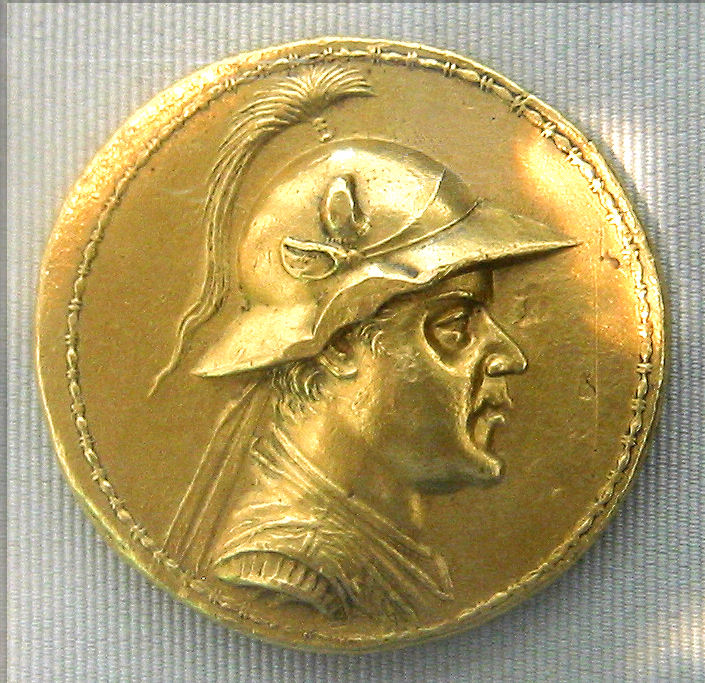
Gold 20-stater of Eucratides I, with a 58 mm diameter. It is the largest gold coin to have survived from Antiquity.

The Hellenistic period was characterized by the spread of Greek culture across a large part of the known world. Greek-speaking kingdoms were established in Egypt and Syria, and for a time also in Iran and as far east as what is now Afghanistan and northwestern India. Greek traders spread Greek coins across this vast area, and the new kingdoms soon began to produce their own coins. Because these kingdoms were much larger and wealthier than the Greek city states of the classical period, their coins tended to be more mass-produced, as well as larger, and more frequently in gold. They often lacked the aesthetic delicacy of coins of the earlier period.

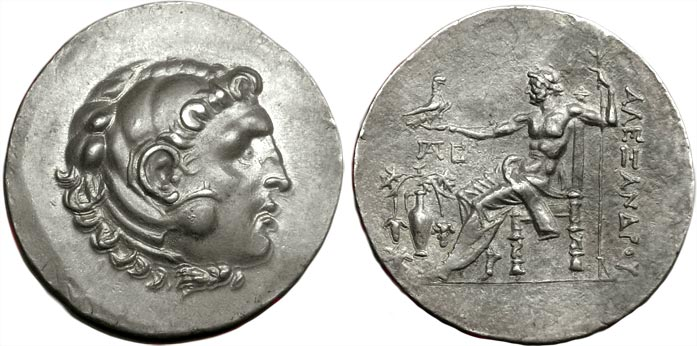
Posthumous Alexander the Great tetradrachm from Temnos, Aeolis. Dated 188–170 BC. Obverse: Alexander the Great as Herakles facing right wearing the nemean lionskin. Reverse: Zeus seated on throne to the left holding eagle in right hand and scepter in left; in left field ΠΑ monogram and angular Σ above grape vine arching over oinochoe; ΑΛΕΞΑΝΔΡΟΥ vertical in right field. Reference: Price 1678.

Still, some of the Greco-Bactrian coins, and those of their successors in India, the Indo-Greeks, are considered the finest examples of Greek numismatic art with "a nice blend of realism and idealization", including the largest coins to be minted in the Hellenistic world: the largest gold coin was minted by Eucratides (reigned 171–145 BC), the largest silver coin by the Indo-Greek king Amyntas Nikator (reigned c. 95–90 BC). The portraits "show a degree of individuality never matched by the often bland depictions of their royal contemporaries further West" (Roger Ling, "Greece and the Hellenistic World").

The most striking new feature of Hellenistic coins was the use of portraits of living people, namely of the kings themselves. This practice had begun in Sicily, but was disapproved of by other Greeks as showing hubris (arrogance). But the kings of Ptolemaic Egypt and Seleucid Syria had no such scruples: having already awarded themselves with "divine" status, they issued magnificent gold coins adorned with their own portraits, with the symbols of their state on the reverse. The names of the kings were frequently inscribed on the coin as well. This established a pattern for coins which has persisted ever since: a portrait of the king, usually in profile and striking a heroic pose, on the obverse, with his name beside him, and a coat of arms or other symbol of state on the reverse.

The Hellenistic period conventionally ends with the Battle of Actium in 31 BC, although a few Hellenistic rulers are known in India until the reign of the Indo-Greek King Strato III (ruled c. 25 BC to 10 AD), who issued the last Hellenistic coinage. Many Greek communities in the eastern half of the Roman empire continued to issue their own coinages, known as Roman provincial coinages or "Greek Imperials" in older scholarship, until the third century AD.

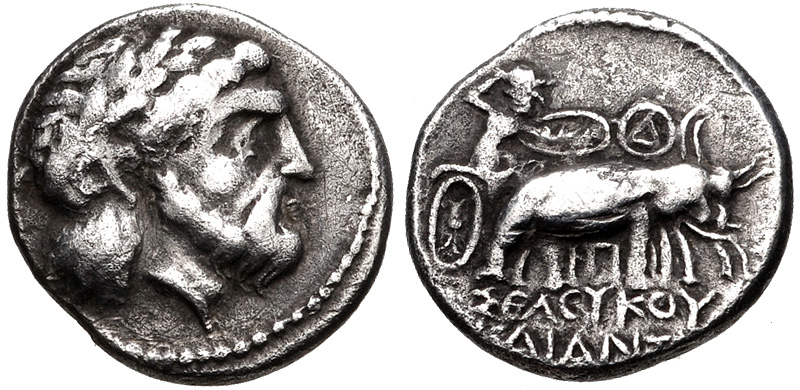
Seleucus Nicator (312-281 BC) hemidrachm, Ai Khanoum.

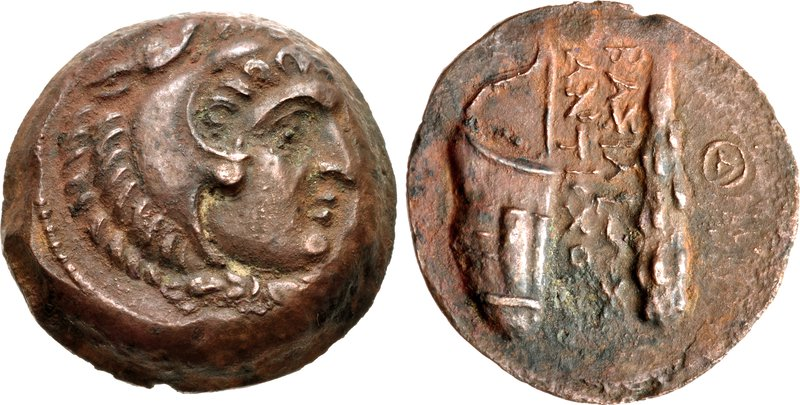
Antiochus I (281-261 BC) coin, Ai Khanoum.

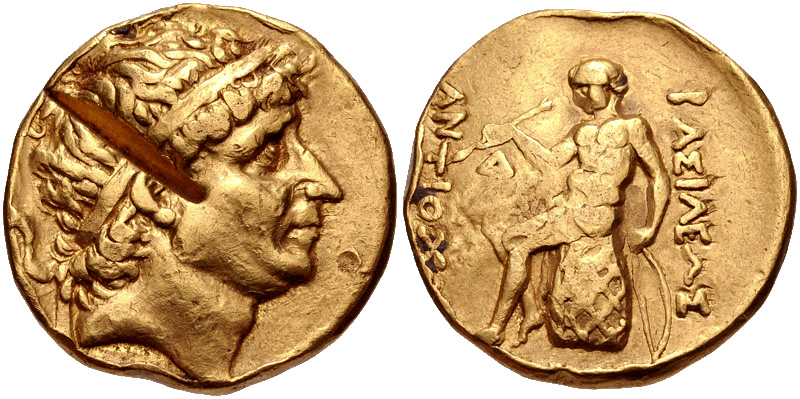
Antiochos II (261-246 BC) stater, Ai Khanoum.

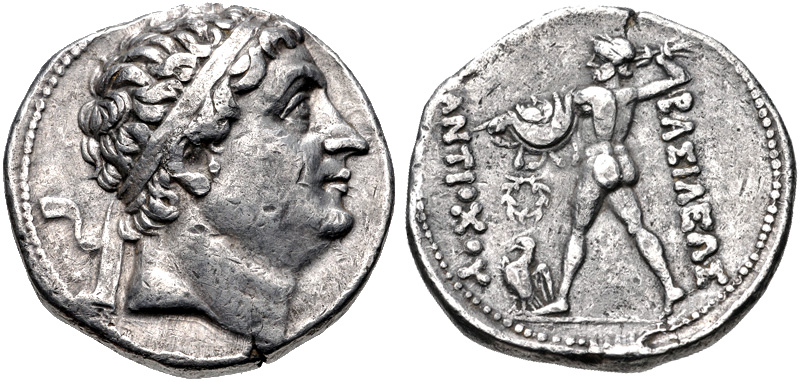
Diodotus I (256-238 BC) tetradrachm.

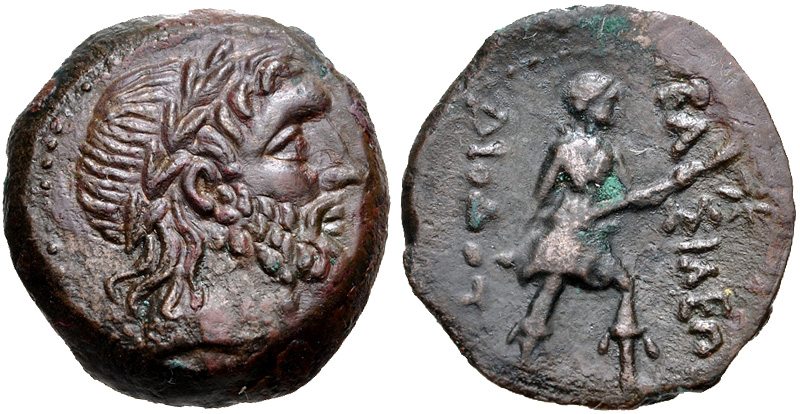
Diodotus II (235-225 BC) coin

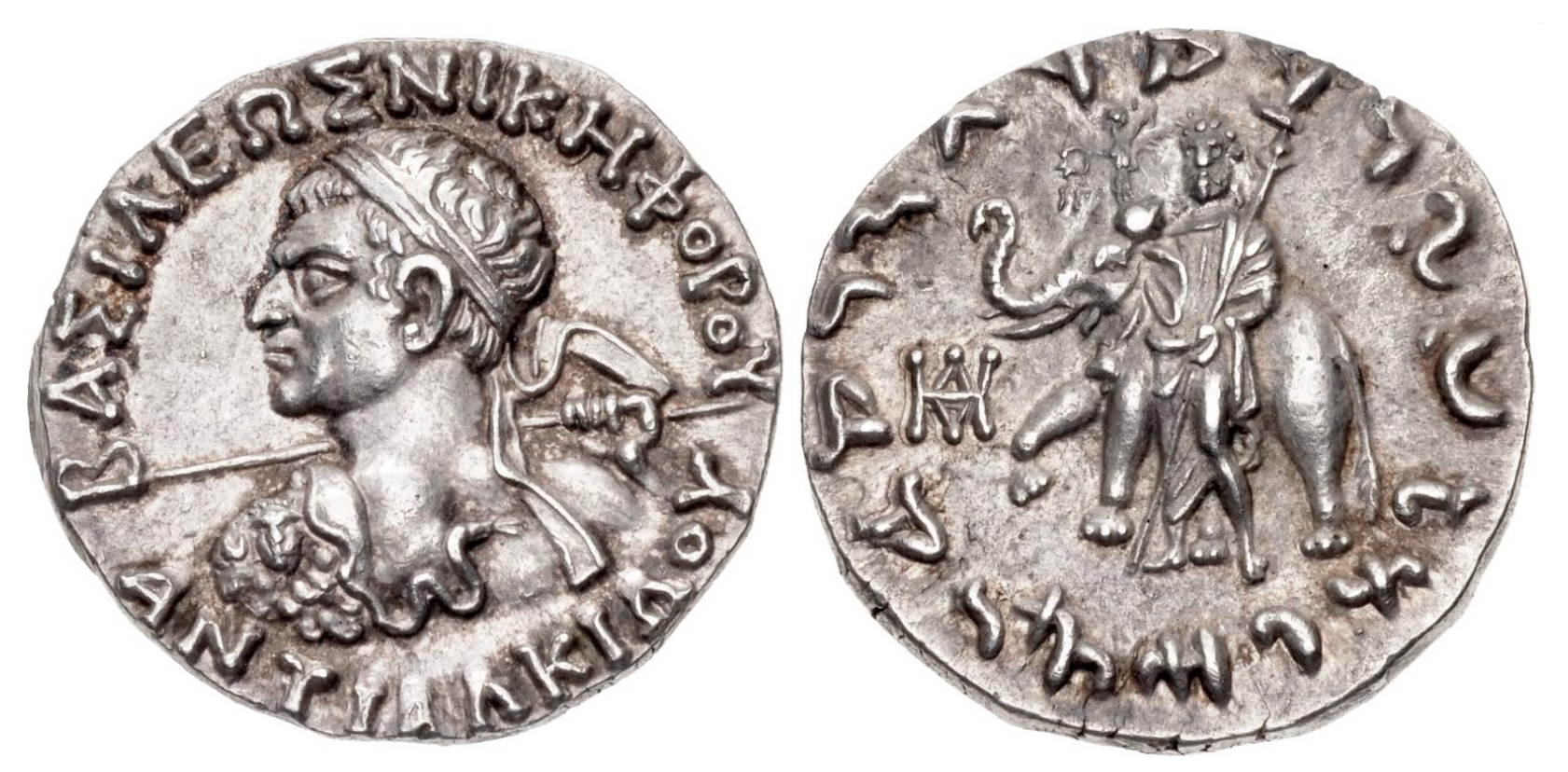
Tetradrachm of Indo-Greek king Antialcidas (105-95 BC).

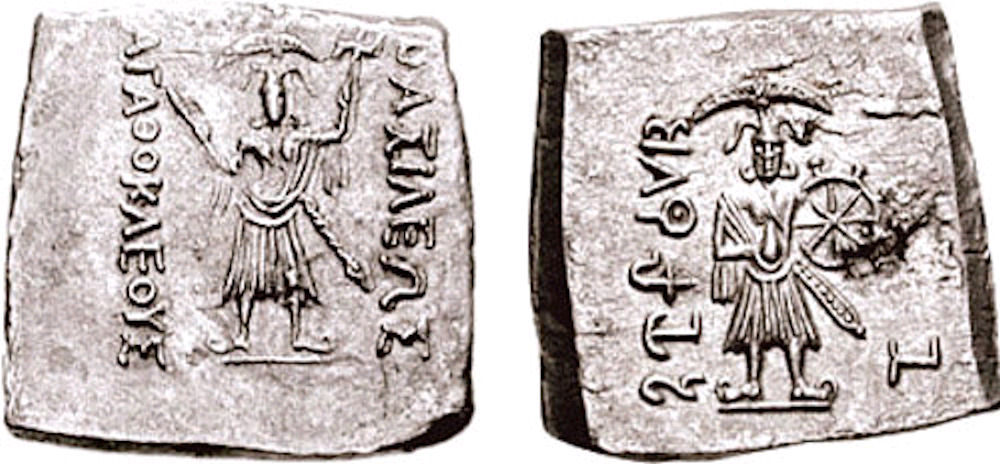
Square drachm of Agathocles of Bactria with Hindu deities, circa 180 BC.

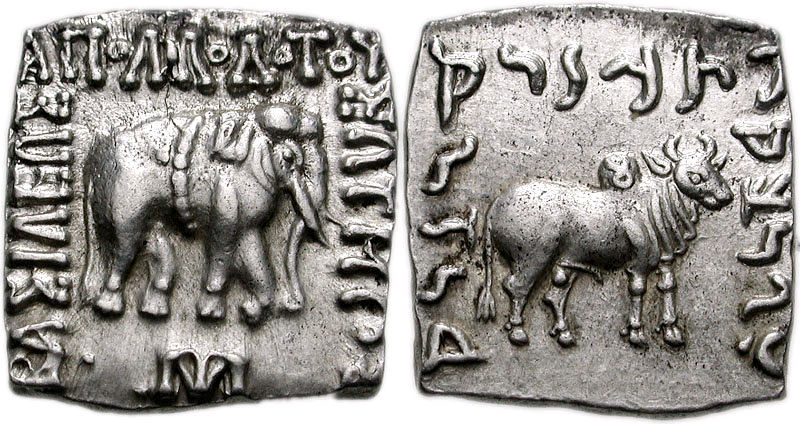
Square drachm of Apollodotus I, Indo-Greeks.

== Minting ==
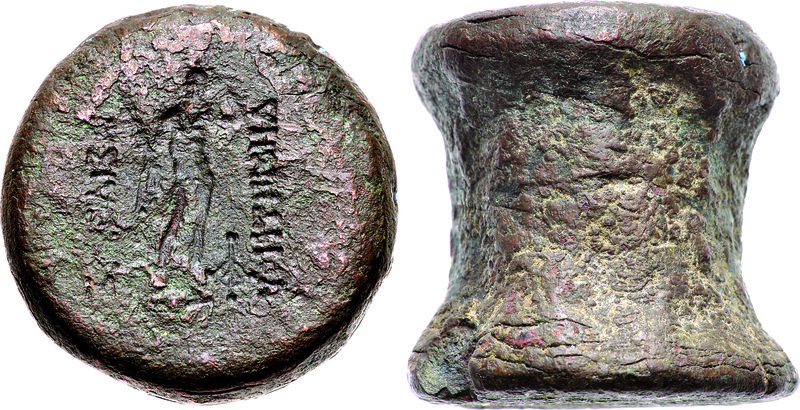
A reverse die for making the silver tetradrachms of Demetrius I of Bactria, one of the only known dies to survive from the Hellenistic period to the present, c. 3rd-2nd century BC.

All Greek coins were handmade, rather than machined as modern coins are. The designs for the obverse and reverse were carved into a block of bronze or possibly iron, called a die. A blank disk of gold, silver, or electrum was cast in a mold and then placed between the dies, possibly heated beforehand, whereupon the coin maker would forcefully strike the top die with a hammer, thereby impressing the designs on the metal.

== Coins as a symbol of the city-state ==
Coins of Greek city-states depicted a unique symbol or feature, an early form of emblem, also known as badge in numismatics, that represented their city and promoted the prestige of their state. Corinthian stater for example depicted pegasus the mythological winged stallion, tamed by their hero Bellerophon. Coins of Ephesus depicted the bee sacred to Artemis. Drachmas of Athens depicted the owl of Athena. Drachmas of Aegina depicted a chelone. Coins of Selinunte depicted a "selinon" (σέλινον, celery). Coins of Heraclea depicted Heracles. Coins of Gela depicted a man-headed bull, the personification of the river Gela. Coins of Rhodes depicted a "rhodon" (ῥόδον, rose). Coins of Panticapaeum depicted the griffin, in particular on Bismuth Coin of Panticapaeum and on Gold Coin from Panticapaeum which were sold in Zurich in 2023 over for $6 million with new price record for ancient Greek coins, Coins of Knossos depicted the labyrinth or the mythical creature minotaur, a symbol of the Minoan Crete. Coins of Melos depicted a "mēlon" (μήλον - apple). Coins of Thebes depicted a Boeotian shield.

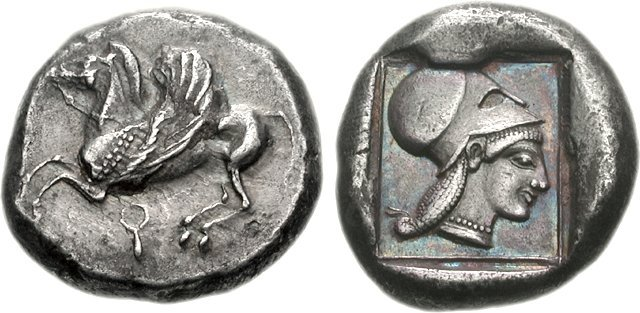
Corinthian stater with pegasus

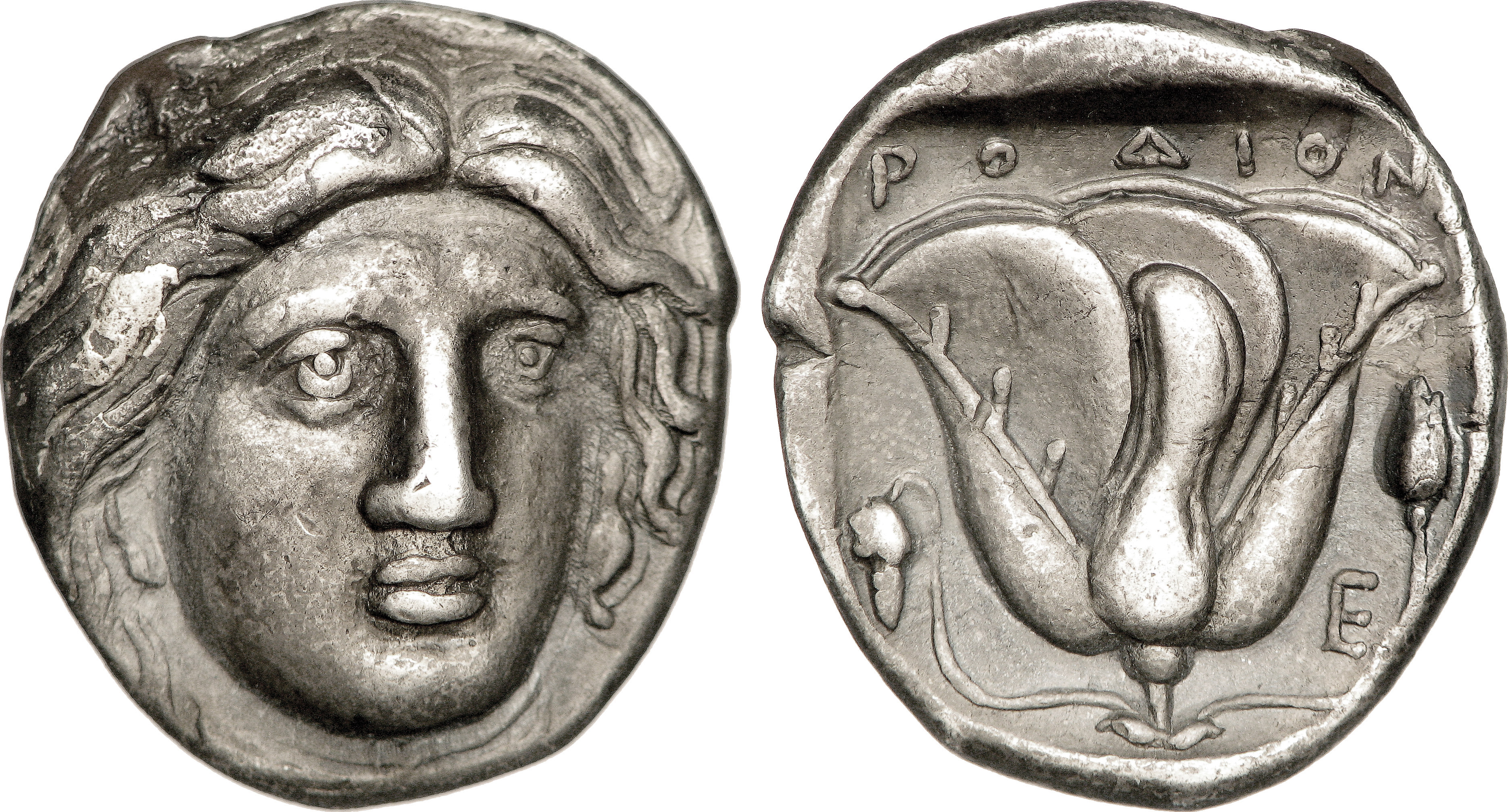
Tetradrachm of Rhodes with a rose

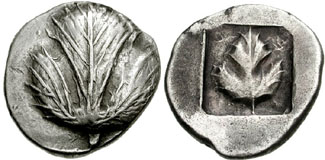
Didrachm of Selinunte with a celery

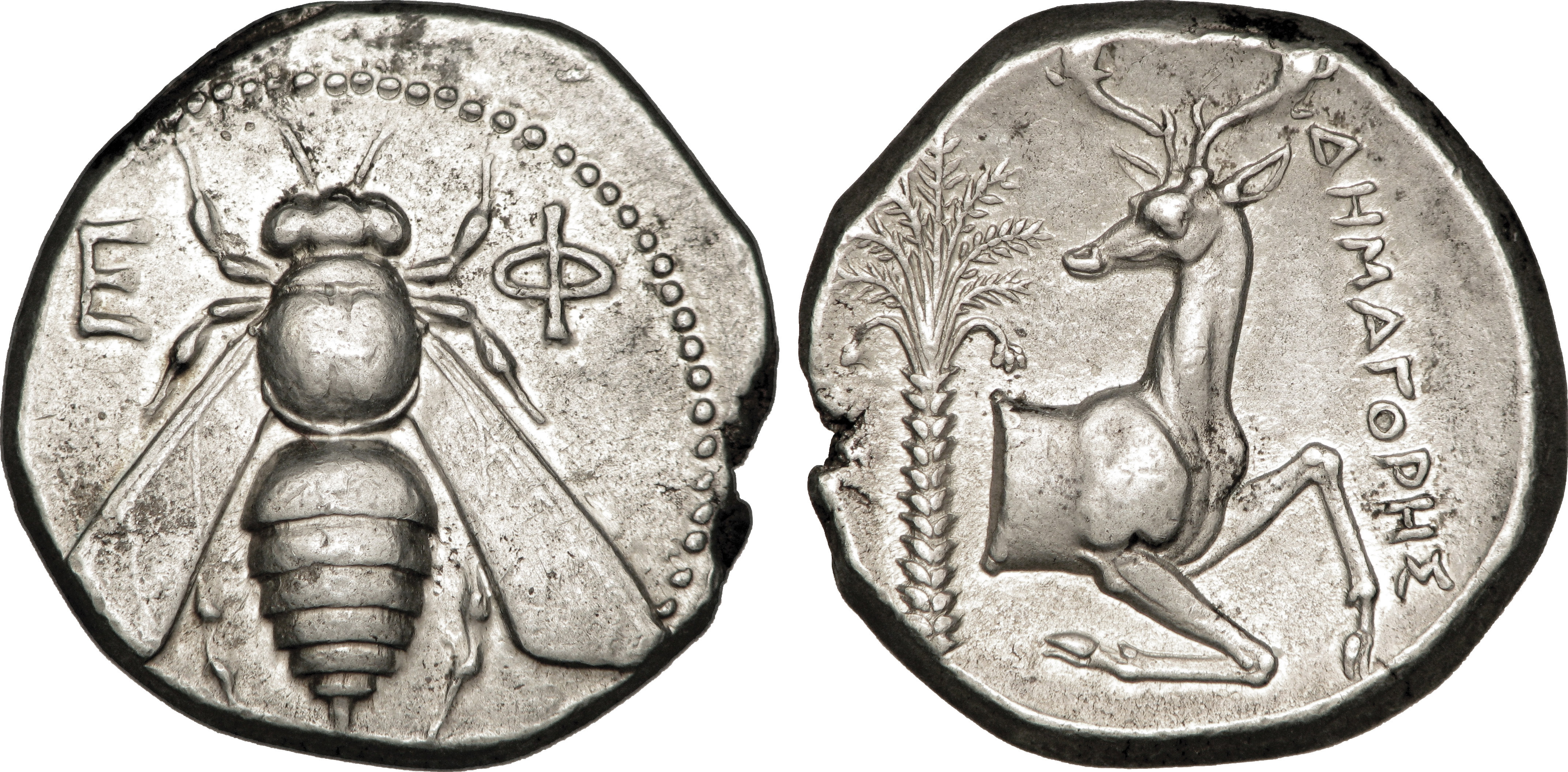
Tetradrachm of Ephesus with a bee

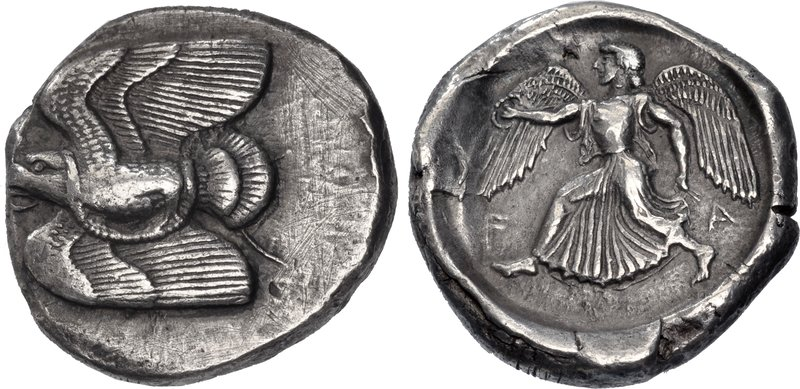
Stater of Olympia depicting Nike

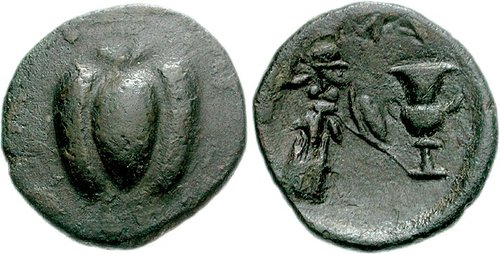
Coin of Melos with an apple

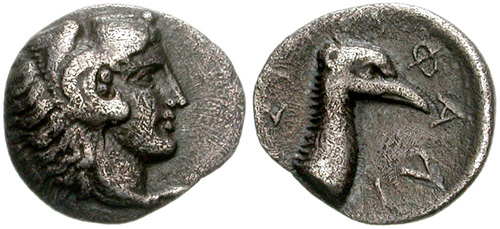
Obolus from Stymphalus with a Stymphalian bird

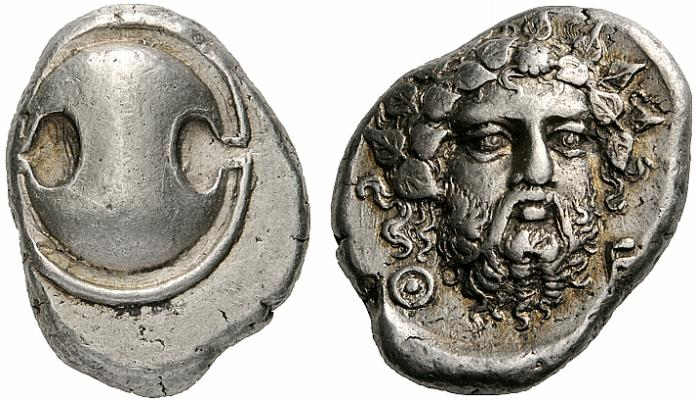
Stater of Thebes with a Boeotian shield

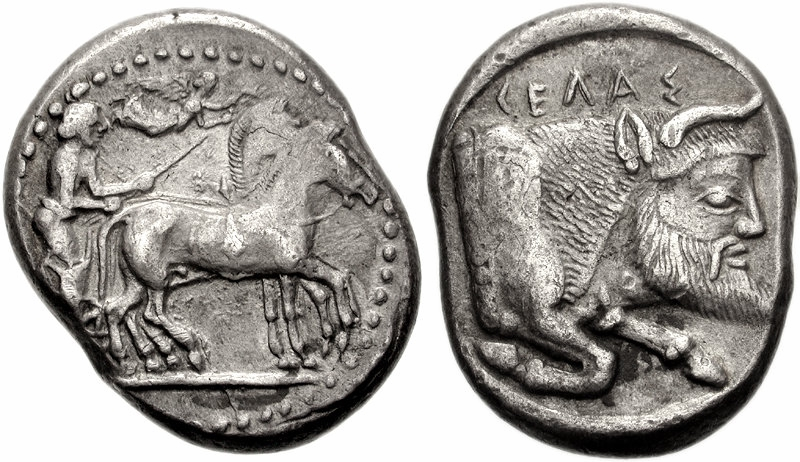
Tetradrachm of Gela with a man-headed bull, the personification of the river Gela

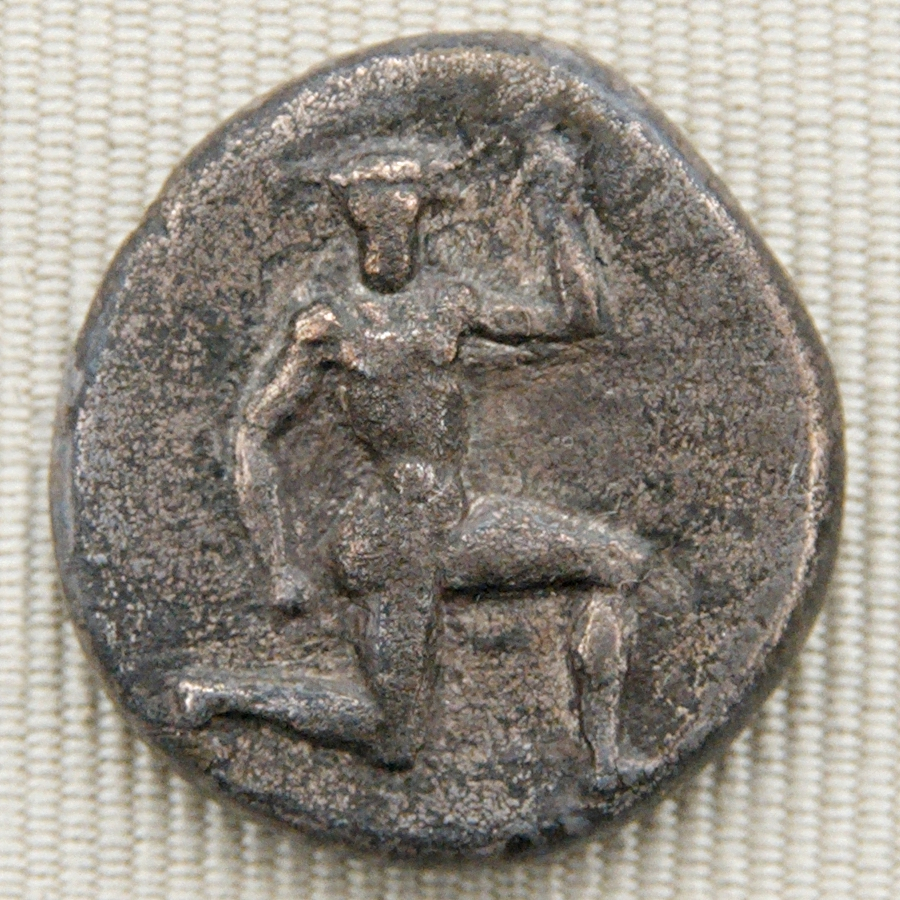
Didrachm of Knossos depicting the Minotaur

== Ancient Greek coins today ==
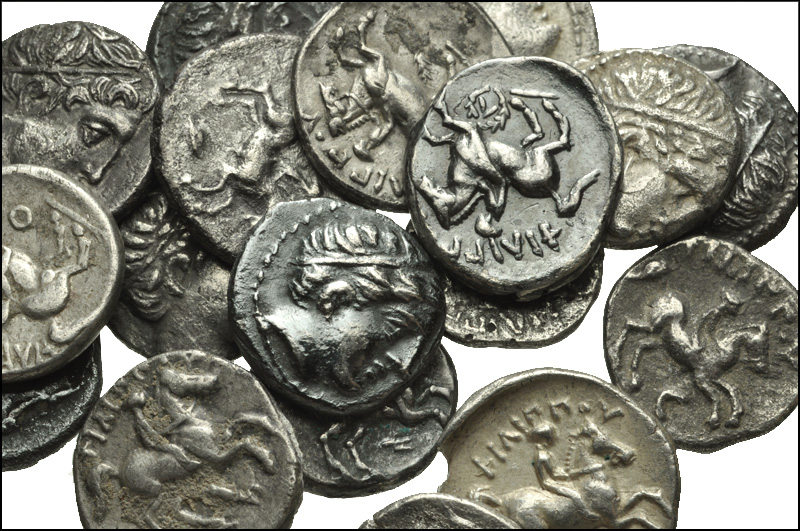
Various ancient Greek coins

Collections of ancient Greek coins are held by museums around the world, of which the collections of the British Museum, the American Numismatic Society, and the Danish National Museum are considered to be the finest. The American Numismatic Society collection comprises some 100,000 ancient Greek coins from many regions and mints, from Spain and North Africa to Afghanistan. To varying degrees, these coins are available for study by academics and researchers.

There is also an active collector market for Greek coins. Several auction houses in Europe and the United States specialize in ancient coins (including Greek) and there is also a large on-line market for such coins.

Hoards of Greek coins are still being found in Europe, Middle East, and North Africa, and some of the coins in these hoards find their way onto the market. Due to the numbers in which they were produced, the durability of the metals, and the ancient practice of burying large numbers of coins to save them, coins are an ancient art within the reach of ordinary collectors.

== See also ==
- Art of ancient Greece
- Philippeioi
- Tetradrachm
- Silver stater with a turtle, early coin
