= Disueri Lake =

- Location within Sicily
- Location: Province of Caltanissetta, Sicily
- Coordinates: 37.195878°N 14.294329°E
- Type: reservoir
- Primary inflows: fiume Disueri
- Primary outflows: fiume Gela
- Catchment area: 239 km^{2} (92 sq mi)
- Basin countries: Italy
- Surface area: 0.6 km^{2} (0.23 sq mi)
- Average depth: 3.8 m (12 ft)
- Max. depth: 7 m (23 ft)
- Water volume: 2,300,000 m^{3} (81,000,000 cu ft)
- Residence time: 1.2 years
- Surface elevation: 144 m (472 ft)

Disueri Lake is a lake in the Province of Caltanissetta, Sicily, Italy. It was formed in the late 1940s by damming Gela river. It has an elevation of 144 m, surface area of 0.6 km^{2} and an average depth of 3.8 m.
