= Statuette of hoplite (Berlin Antiquities Collection Misc. 7470) =

Statuette of hoplite (Berlin antiquities collection Misc. 7470)
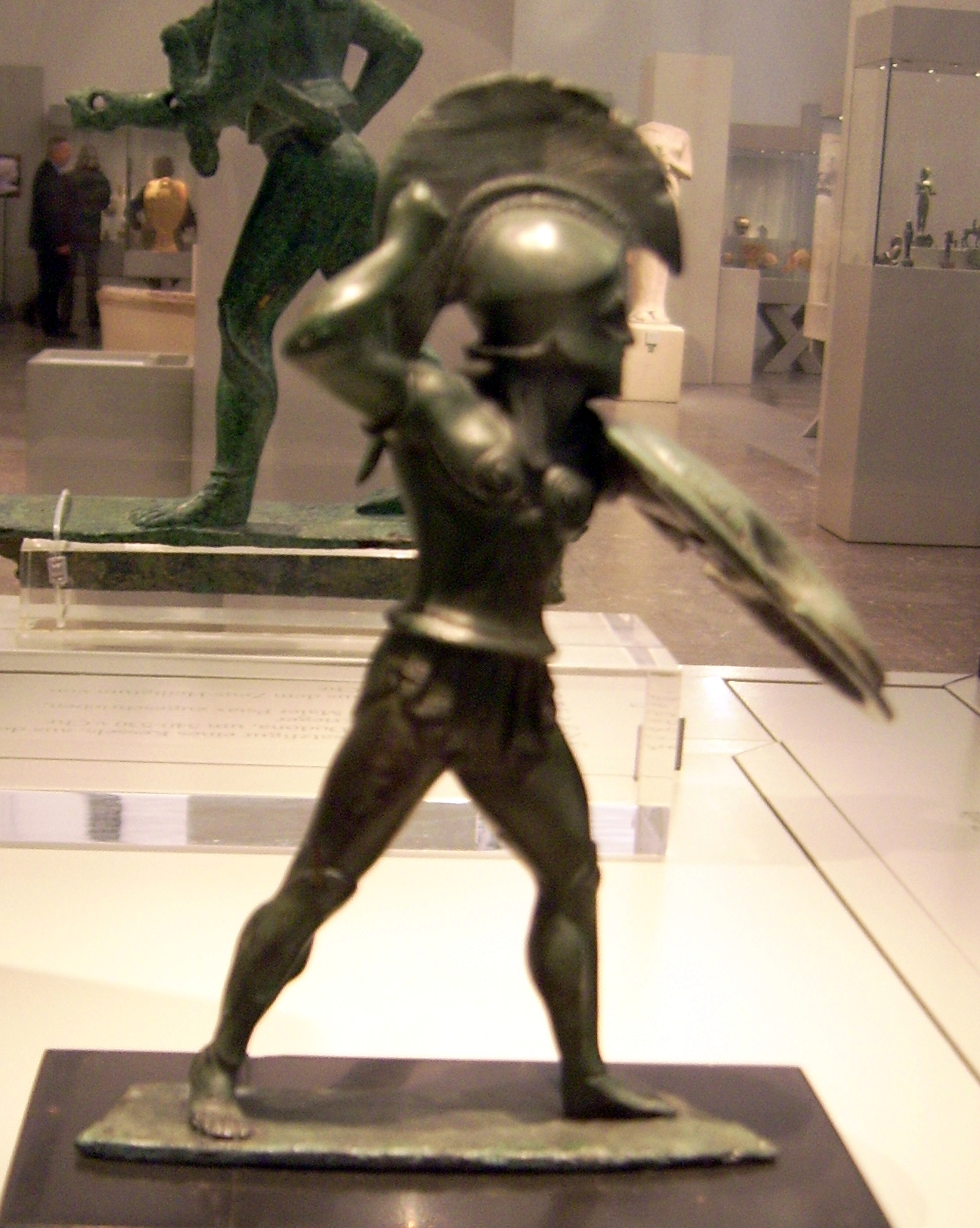
- Year: 540/30 BC
- Catalogue: Misc. 7470
- Dimensions: 12,8 cm (50 in)
- Location: Berlin antiquities collection, Altes Museum; Berlin

The statuette of hoplite found at Dodona (Berlin antiquities collection, Misc. 7470, Antikensammlung der Staatlichen Museen zu Berlin, Misc. 7470) is an archaeological find which was purchased in 1880 and is hosted today in Berlin at the Altes Museum

== Description ==
On a thin, elongated base stands a hoplite warrior in an offensive stance, armed with helmet, chest armour and greaves. In the left he is holding a Boeotian shield, while with his right he is brandishing a spear. The spear is lost, but the hole in the hand determines the original direction. The whole performance is vibrant and lively. The look of the bearded warrior above the shield is targeting an enemy. The muscles of the body are excellently curved and his posture shows that he is ready for a direct attack. The warrior wears a tunic through the chest resulting in triangled tuck. The rest of the body is naked, and he does not wear sandals. On his right cheek appears a thick tress peeping from inside the helmet, and reaching down to his chest.

This bronze, which was a statuette at the edge of a boiler, originating at the late sixth century BC (near 500 BC), shows significant differences from earlier similar statuettes and is characterized as a masterpiece, showing the transformation from the previously used bound step position to the free striding, characterizing a new generation of sculptors
