= Boeotian helmet =

Ancient combat helmet of Greek origin

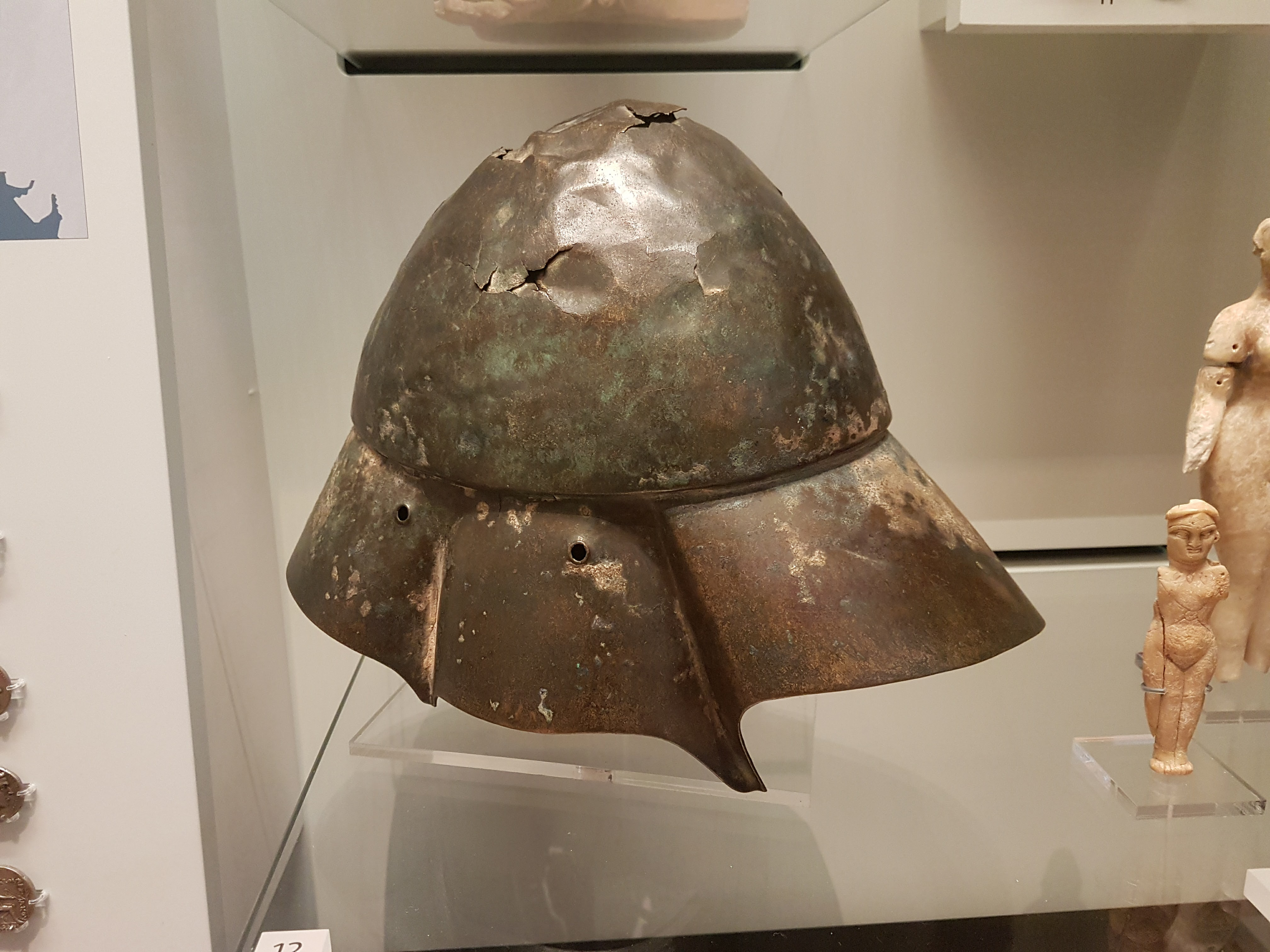
Boeotian bronze helmet found in the Tigris River in Iraq; the front of the helmet is to the right. Displayed at the Ashmolean Museum, Oxford.

The Boeotian helmet was a type of combat helmet used in Ancient Greece and Greek-influenced regions during the classical and Hellenistic periods, as well as in Ancient Rome; it possibly originated in the Greek region of Boeotia.

== Characteristics ==
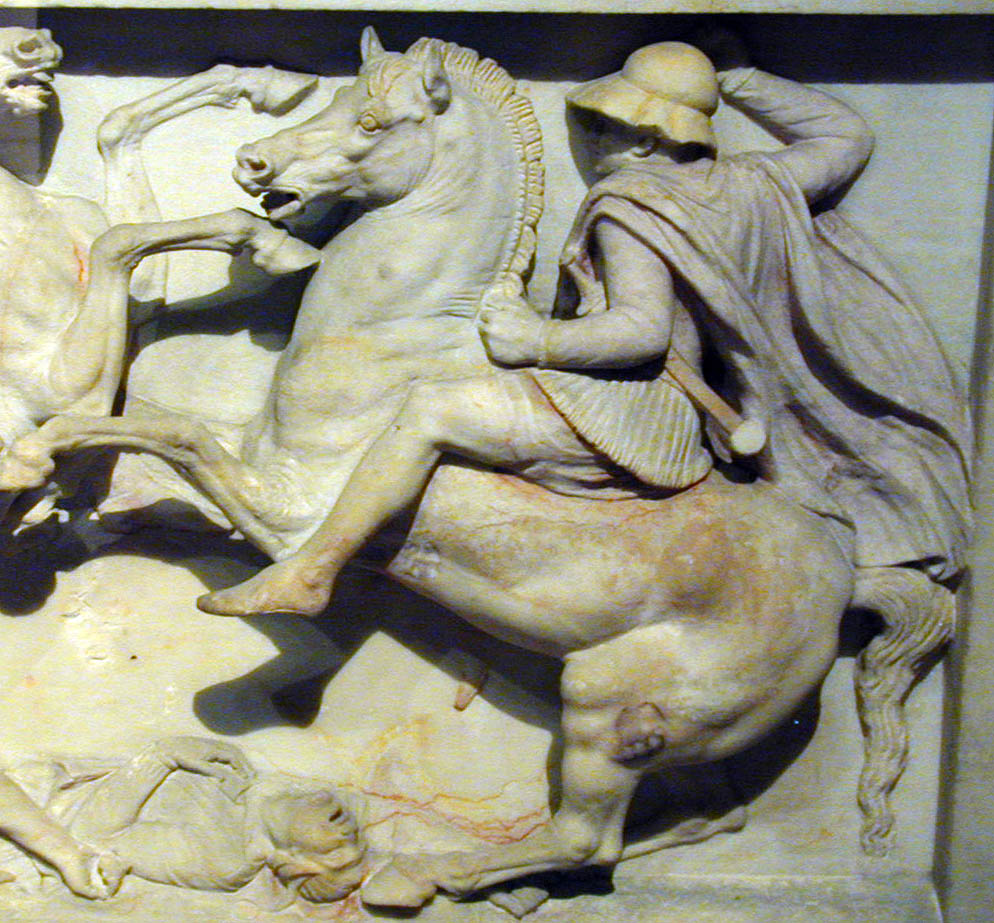
Thessalian cavalryman from the Alexander Sarcophagus wearing a Boeotian helmet.

The Boeotian helmet was modelled on the shape of a folded-down Boeotian variant of the petasos, a type of Greek sun hat, usually made of felt. As an open helmet, it allowed good peripheral vision and unimpaired hearing. It had a domed skull surrounded by a wide, flaring, down-sloping brim. The brim came down at the rear to protect the back of the neck, projected forward over the forehead and was worked into a complex shape at the sides, with downward pointing folds affording some lateral protection to the face. A long falling plume was sometimes attached to this type of helmet. The need for unimpeded vision and good hearing was particularly acute for cavalrymen, therefore this type of helmet was used primarily by mounted troops.

This type of helmet was beaten from a single sheet of bronze using a helmet-shaped "former," one of which, made of limestone, is extant. An excellently-preserved example of a Boeotian helmet, which may have belonged to one of Alexander the Great's cavalrymen, was recovered from the Tigris River in Iraq, and is now in the Ashmolean Museum. In the late Hellenistic period, the helmet evolved into a type with a taller, more conical skull and often a reduced brim.

== Use ==
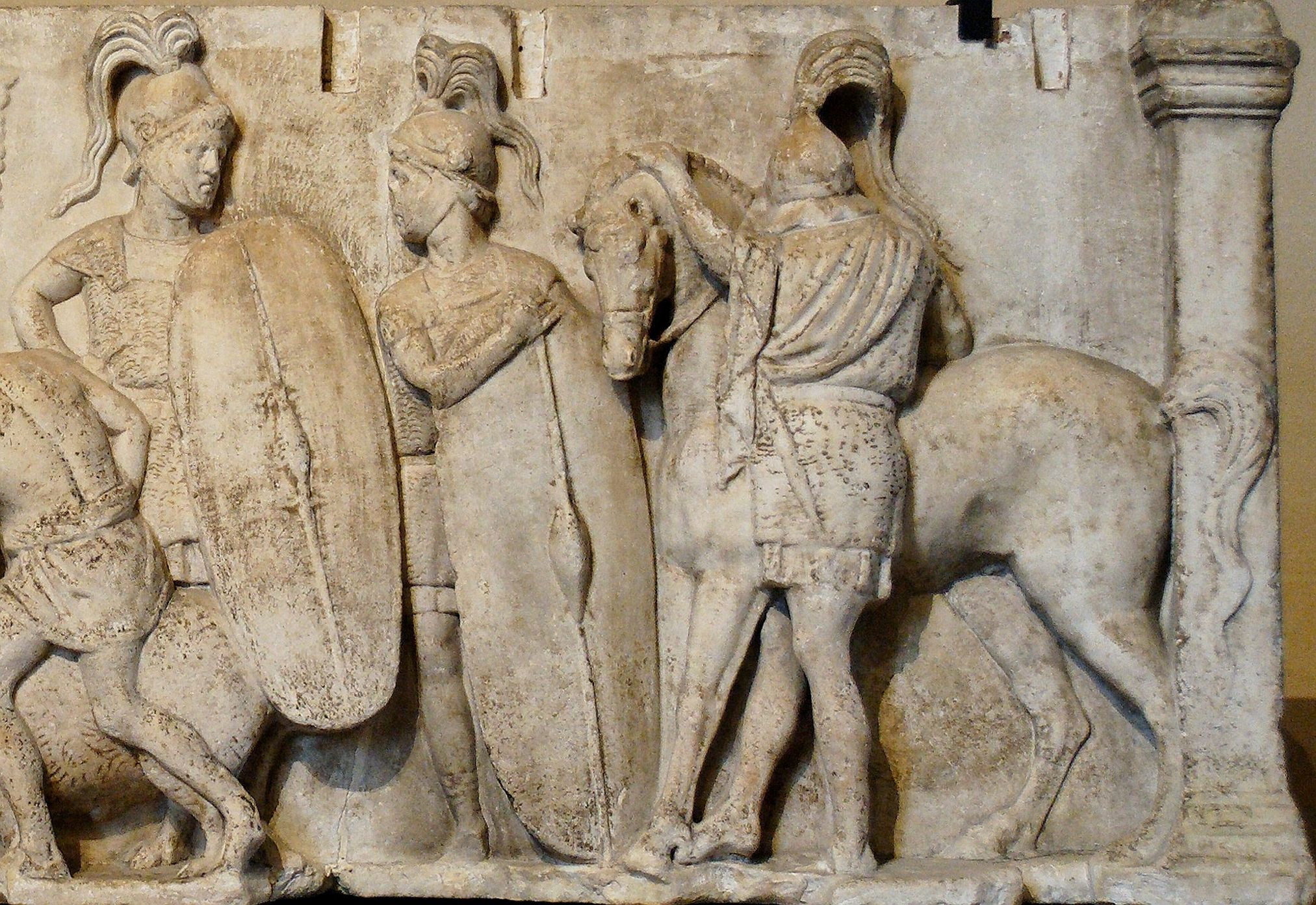
Roman altar of Domitius Ahenobarbus (late 2nd century BC); the soldier holding his horse at the right wears a plumed Boeotian helmet.

The Athenian military expert and author Xenophon particularly recommended the Boeotian helmet for cavalry, saying "...the Boeotian type [of helmet]. For this not only gives the greatest protection to all the parts above the cuirass, but allows free vision." This piece of advice was taken up by Alexander the Great, who equipped his cavalry with this helmet. Both the Alexander Sarcophagus and the Alexander Mosaic show cavalrymen of the Ancient Macedonian army wearing Boeotian helmets. As a specialised cavalry helmet, its use was not as widespread as some other ancient helmets such as the Corinthian or Phrygian types.

This helmet continued to be used by the successors of Alexander the Great, likely throughout the Hellenistic world, but is especially evident in the Greco-Bactrian and Indo-Greek kingdoms whose rulers often wore a variant of the helmet on coin depictions. This was a very unusual and rare practice as most Hellenistic kings were shown wearing only the royal diadems on their coins.

The helmet was also used by Roman citizen cavalry in the Republican period. On the altar of Gnaeus Domitius Ahenobarbus (a consul in 122 BC), a Roman cavalryman is depicted wearing it with the later more conical skull and furnished with a falling horsehair plume.

The naming conventions and typology of ancient helmets are largely of modern origin and do not reflect contemporary usage. The term "Boeotian helmet", however, is an exception since it was employed by Xenophon and is therefore of contemporary usage. Another piece of martial equipment linked to the region of Boeotia is the Boeotian shield; however, no surviving examples have been found, and its association with the region is largely through depictions on local coinage.

== Gallery ==
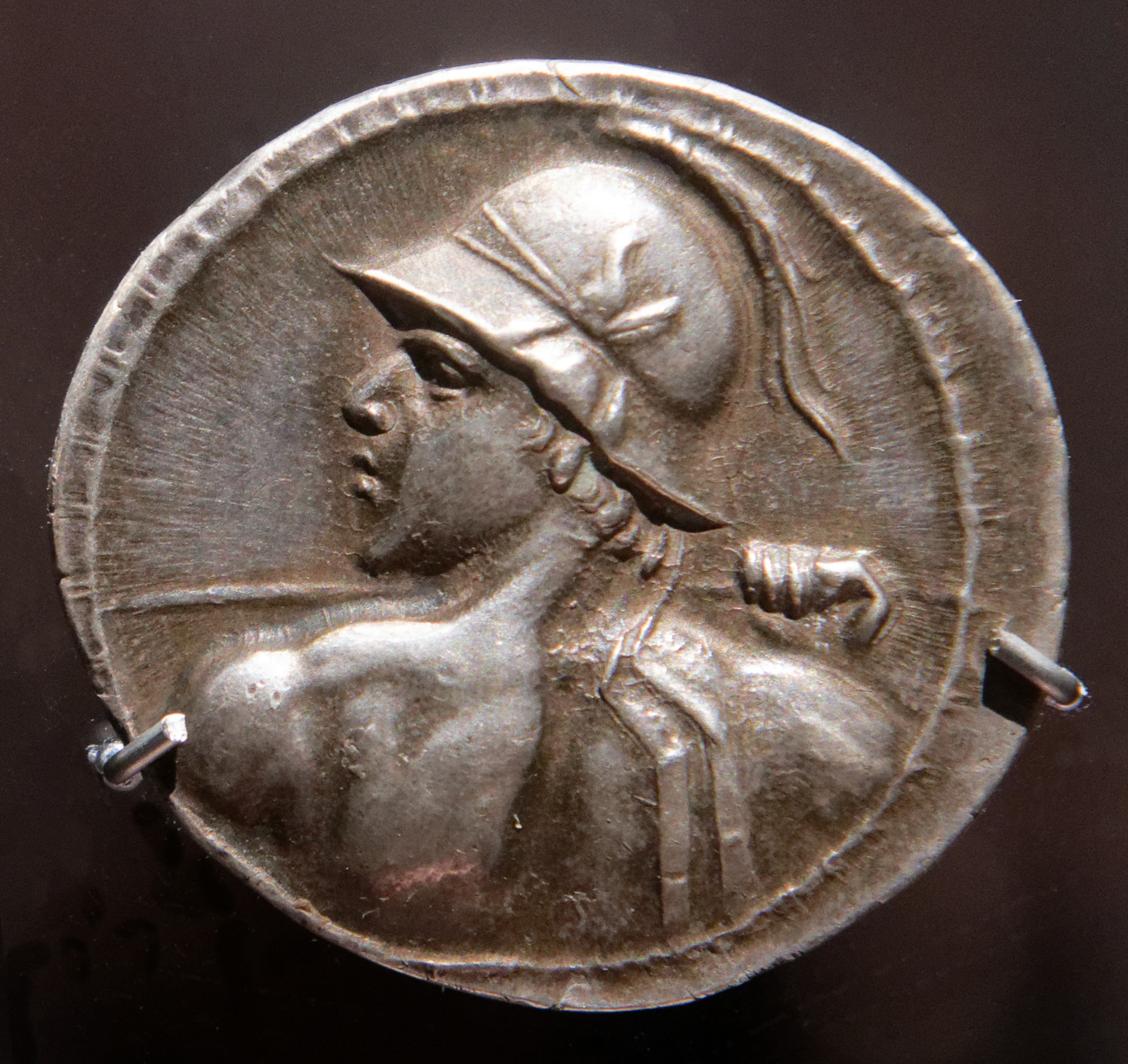
Coin of Eucratides I wearing a crested Boeotian helmet, decorated with bull's horn and ear; c. 171–145 BC.

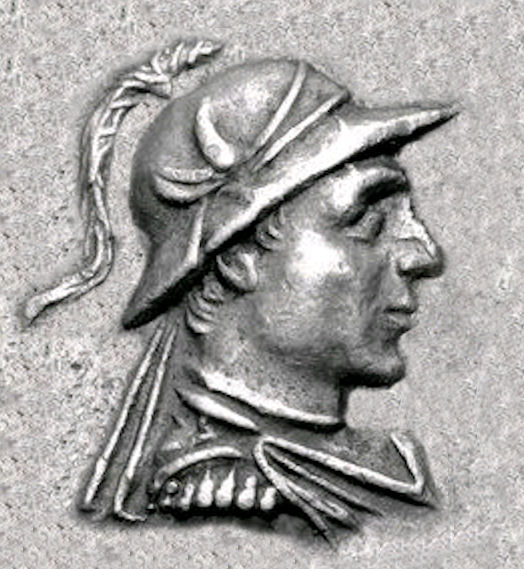
Indo-Greek king Hermaeus wearing a similar helmet, depicted on one of his silver coins; c. 90–70 BC.

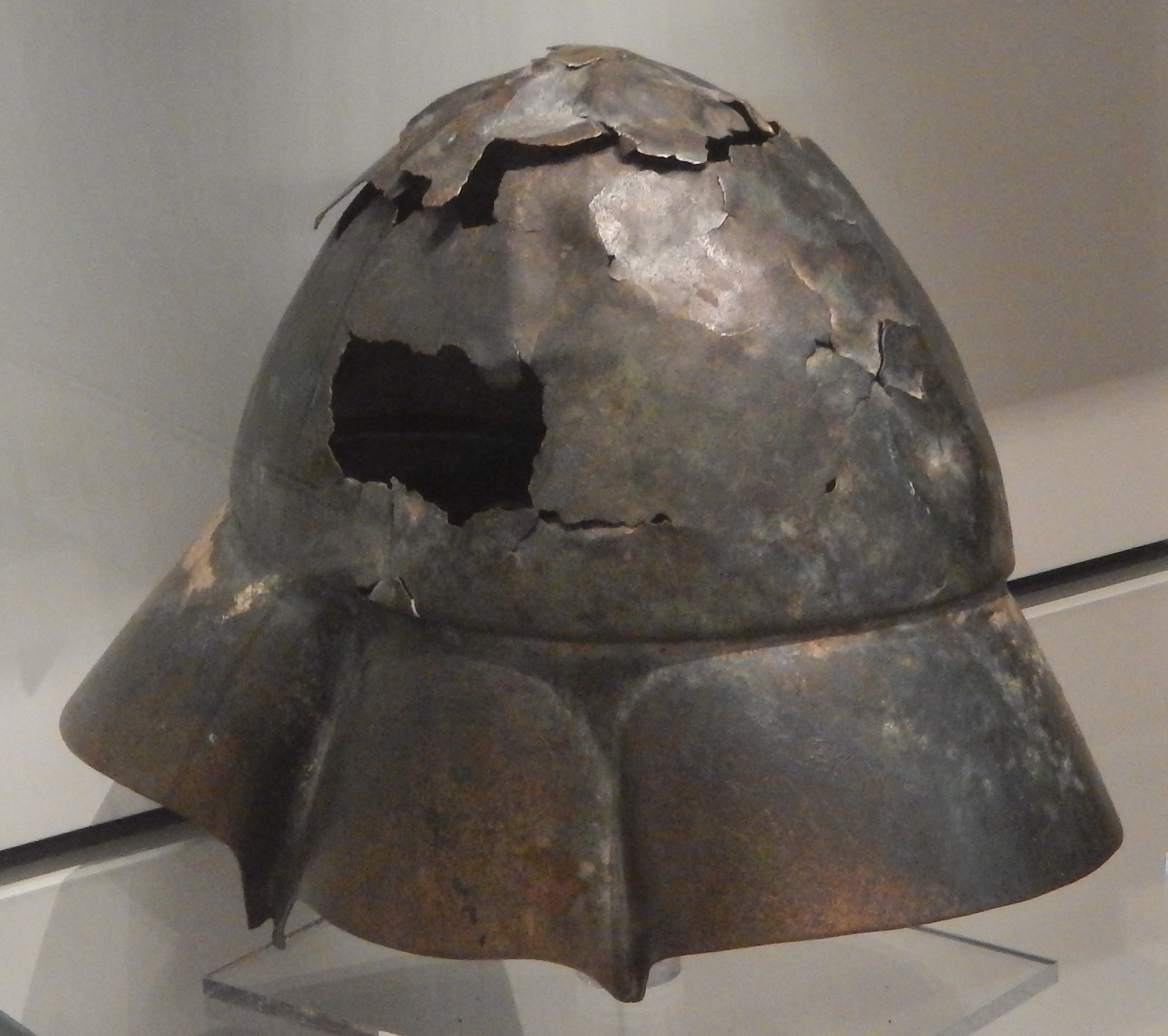
A Boeotian helmet found in the Tigris river, seen from a different angle showing damage.

== Bibliography ==
- Anderson, John Kinloch (1961). Ancient Greek Horsemanship. Berkeley and Los Angeles: University of California Press.
- Connolly, Peter (1998). Greece and Rome at War. London: Greenhill Books. ISBN 978-1-85367-303-0.
- Fraser, A.D. (1922). "Xenophon and the Boeotian Helmet". The Art Bulletin. 4 (3): 99–108. doi:10.2307/3046411. JSTOR 3046411.
- Sekunda, Nick (2002). Marathon 490 BC: The First Persian Invasion Of Greece. Oxford: Osprey Publishing. ISBN 978-0-27-598836-4.
