= Shaikhan Dehri hoard =

- Shaikhan Dehri hoard
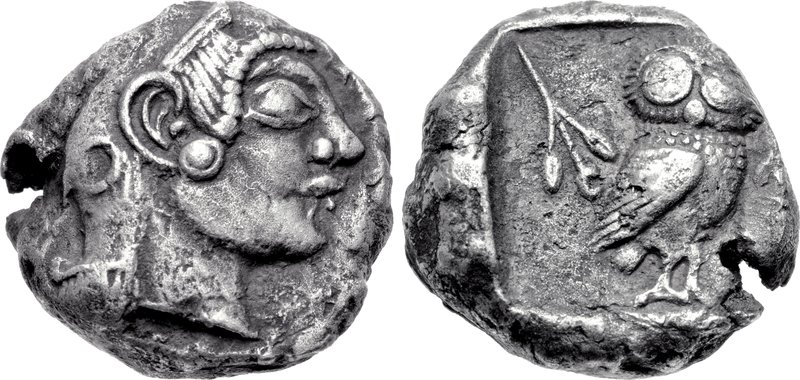
- Athens coin (Circa 500/490-485 BCE) discovered in Pushkalavati. This coin is the earliest known example of its type to be found so far east.

- Location within Pakistan
- 34°10′4.8″N 71°44′9.6″E
- Type: Coin hoard

The Shaikhan Dheri hoard is a small coin hoard that was discovered in 2007 at the site of ancient Pushkalavati in modern-day Pakistan. The hoard weighed 14 kilograms, contained "bent bars" as well as round coins "of a new type" as those discovered in the Kabul hoard. The hoard contained a tetradrachm minted in Athens circa 500/490–485/0 BCE, or possibly as early as 520 BCE, together with a number of local types as well as silver cast ingots. The Athens coin is the earliest known example of its type to be found so far to the east. This hoard exists in the context of the Achaemenid conquest of the Indus Valley. It can also be related to another famous hoard in the region, the Kabul hoard.

The hoard also contained short "punch-marked" bent bars, also found in the Kabul hoard, and attributed by Bopearachchi to the Paropamisadae. They are of Achaemenid weight standard, weighing either 1 siglos (5.5 g) or 2 sigloi (11 g), and measuring between 25 mm to 30 mm long. These are different from the punch-marked bent bars found in Taxila, which are significantly longer (35 and 55 mm).

The hoard also contained round "punch-marked" coins, the punch mark consisting in a geometrical motif made of a central circle with line around.

Virgin flans were also present in the hoard as well as silver ingots (about 400g each, corresponding to the manufacture by melting about 72 Achaemenid sigloi) used for the manufacture of coins. The composition of the ingots has been shown to be strictly identical to the composition of the local coinage (but different from the composition of standard royal Achaemenid sigloi). This shows that coins were being manufactured in Pushkalavati by the 5th century BCE, and that the metallurgical techniques involved in coin minting were readily available in the Indian Satrapies of the Achaemenid Empire at that time, well before the arrival of Alexander the Great.

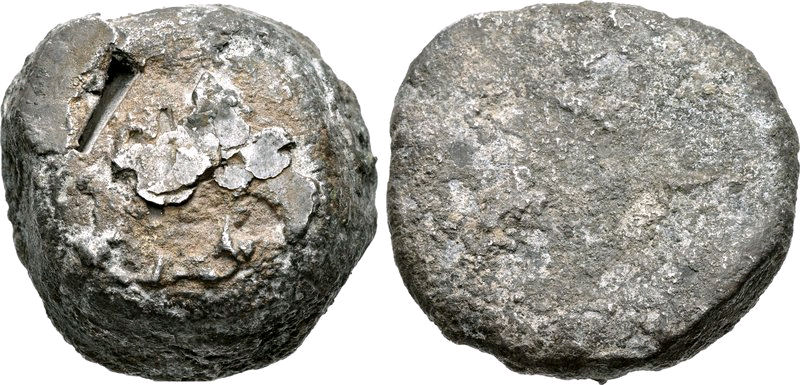
Achaemenid period silver ingot, Pushkalavati, Gandhara.

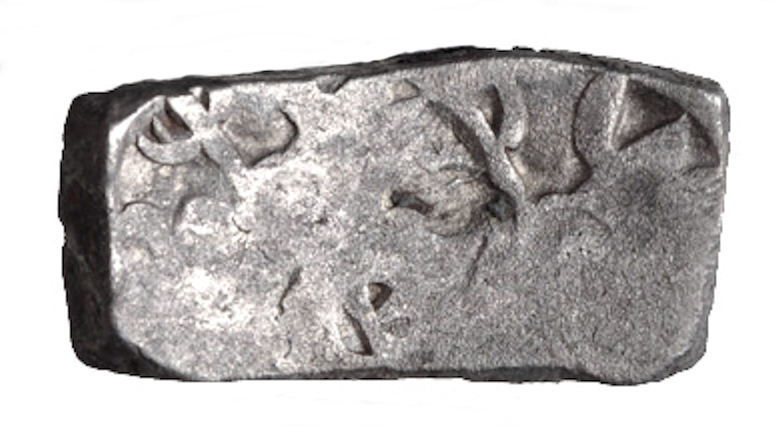
Short "bent-bar" punch-marked coin minted under Achaemenid administration, of the type found in the Shaikhan Dehri hoard.

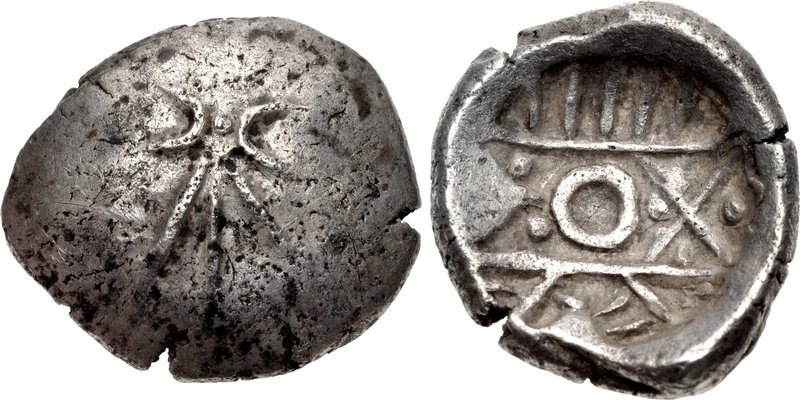
Punch-marked coin minted in the Kabul Valley under the Achaemenid administration. Also similar to some of the types found in the Shaikhan Dehri hoard.

== Bibliography ==
- Bopearachchi, Osmund (2017), "Achaemenids and Mauryans: Emergence of Coins and Plastic Arts in India", in Alka Patel; Touraj Daryaee (eds.), India and Iran in the Longue Durée, UCI Jordan Center for Persian Studies, pp. 15–48
