= Tetartemorion =

Emporiai (Empúries)
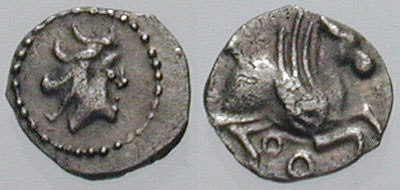
First side of the image: Head right
Second side of the image: Pegasus.
AR Tetartemorion (0.15 g); ca. 240 BC

Tetartemorion (Ancient Greek: τεταρτημόριον tetartēmorion) is the name of a silver coin minted in ancient Greece, valued at 1/4 of an obol. Its name means "quarter part", from tetarton, meaning a fourth, and morion part, portion.

The weight at Athens was about 0.15-0.18 grams.
