= Gela (river) =

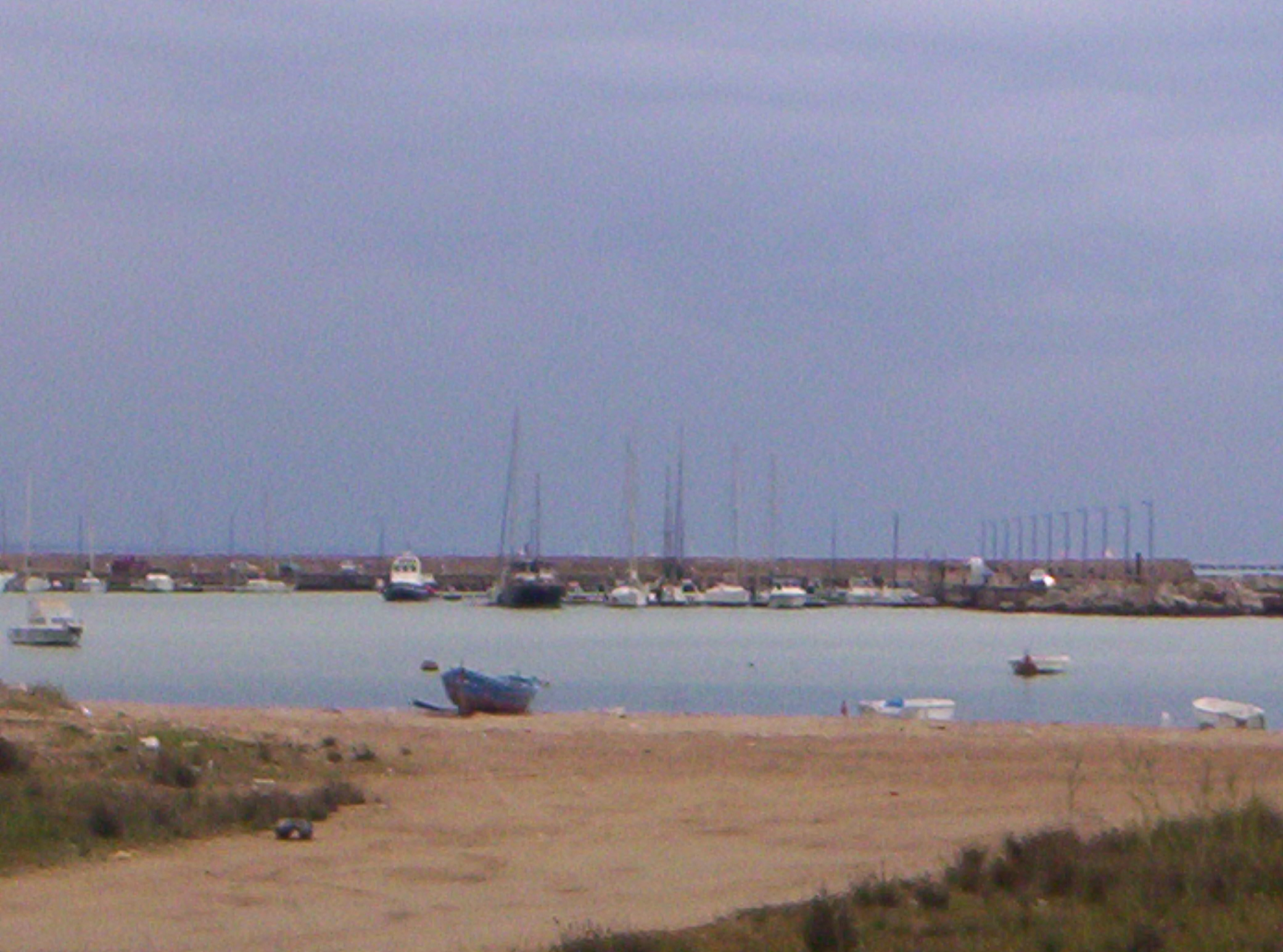

Location
- Country: Italy
- Region: Sicily

Physical characteristics
- Mouth: Mediterranean Sea
  - coordinates: 37.0579°N 14.2603°E

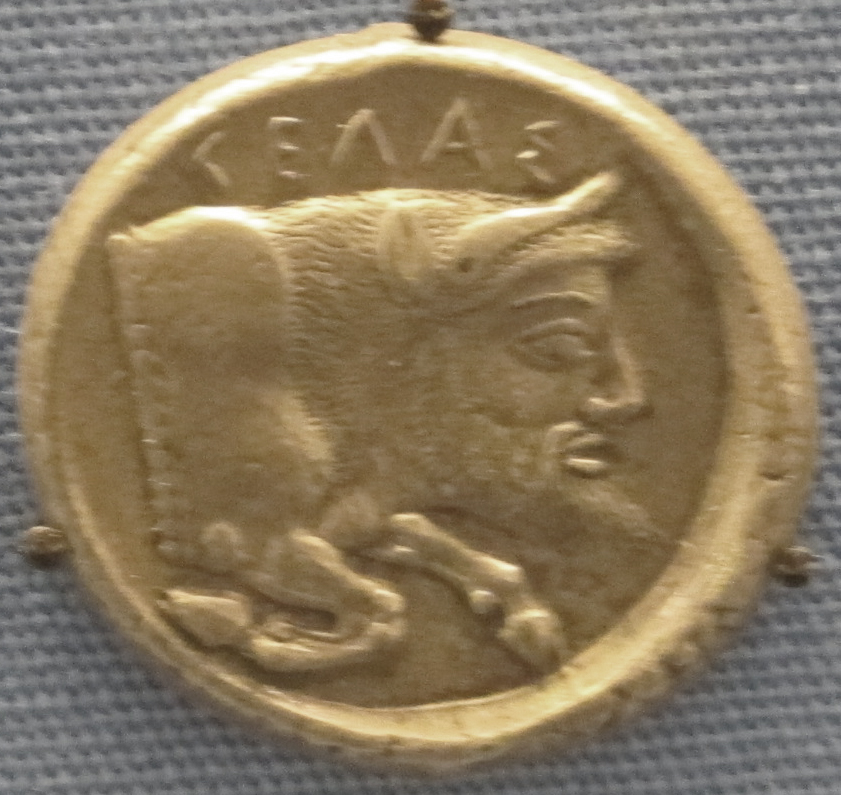
Ancient coins of Gela depicted a man-headed bull, the personification of the river Gela

The Gela river is located in Sicily. It rises at the Disueri lake and, after about 59 kilometers, flows into the Strait of Sicily of the Mediterranean Sea, near the town Gela.

== Overview ==
The extension of the basin of the river is about 569 square kilometers.

Giozzo and Maroglio are its main tributary rivers.

The name Gela (Γέλα) may come from the Greek verb γελάω "I smile/laugh".
