= Boeotian shield =

Ancient Greek shield

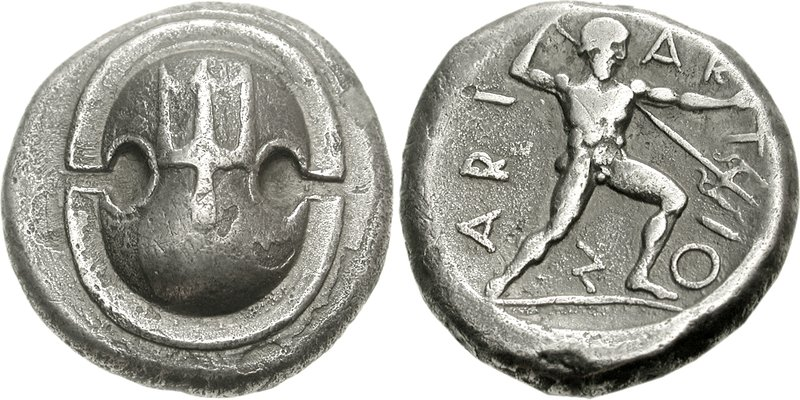
Coin of Haliartus depicting a Boeotian shield with trident device (left)

A Boeotian shield is a large hand-held shield once carried by warriors in ancient Greece. It is similar to the more commonly encountered aspis in that it has an overall circular shape, but differs in having scooped indentations at both sides. The application of the term "Boeotian" to this armament is a modern construct resulting from its frequent appearance on ancient Boeotian coins. No shield of this type has physically survived into the modern era, but this type, along with the Boeotian helmet, are considered characteristic of the warriors of Boeotia.

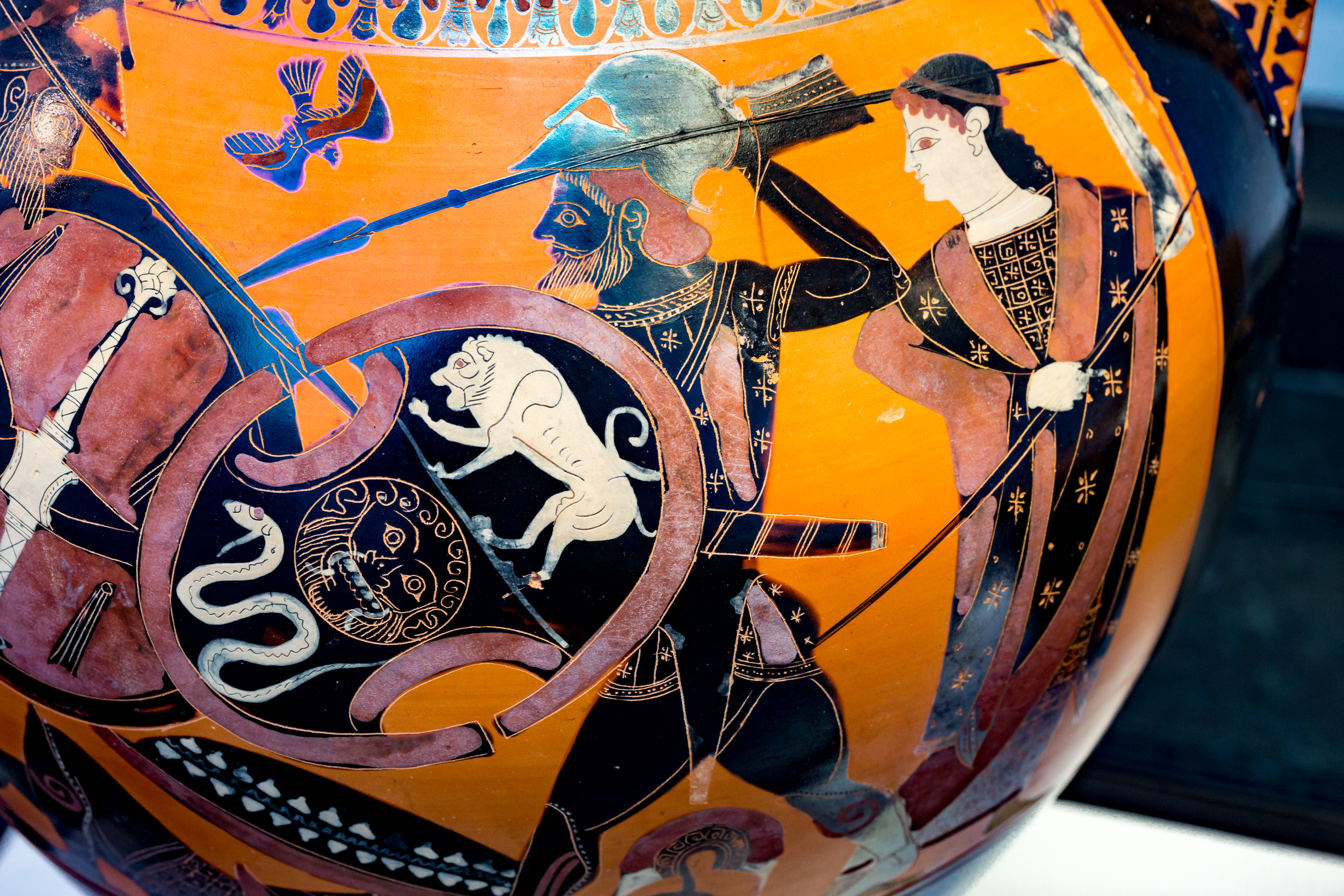
A depiction of a Boeotian shield on Greek pottery

A Greek phalanx was a military unit whose performance was based in part on the relative uniformity of arms and armor of its principal members, the hoplites. This need for uniformity apparently extended to the shape of the groups' shields. The Boeotian shield was narrower and more oval than the circular aspis, and on each of its vertical edges was a scooped indentation not unlike the C-bouts found on the waist of a modern violin and probably used for similar purpose: just as the violin's C-bouts allow the player to run the bow close to the center of the instrument, the Boeotian shield's indentations allowed its bearer to thrust and stab with his weapon(s) from a position closer to the shield's center rather than having to reach around or over the shield to strike. They also reduced the shield's overall weight somewhat, and as the shield was often the heaviest piece of equipment carried by a warrior, any reduction in its weight would have been welcome. It is also possible that the Boeotian shield was constructed out of animal hides stretched over a wicker frame rather than being made of solid wood and bronze like the aspis— this would account for none from the ancient world having survived. Like the helmets worn by the Boeotians, this less-expensive method of construction would have been preferred by the hoplites of this region, who were often less well off than their counterparts in other regions of greater Greece.
