= Hayley =

- Pronunciation: /ˈheɪli/
- Gender: Female
- Language: English

Origin
- Meaning: Hay clearing
- Region of origin: England

Other names
- Related names: Hailee; Hailey; Haley; Hali; Halie; Hailie; Halley; Haylee; Hayly; Haylie; Hayleigh; Haliey

Hayley (pronounced /ˈheɪli/) is an English given name. It is derived from the English surname Haley, which in turn was based on an Old English toponym, a compound of heg "hay" and leah "clearing or meadow".

While it can be used for males, Hayley is most commonly a female given name. This use became popular following the surge to prominence of child actress Hayley Mills (b. 1946), but the name was not used with any frequency prior to the 1980s. Its popularity peaked in the 1980s and early 1990s in the UK and (along with variants such as Haley and Hailey) in the 1990s and 2000s in the US, but since the 2000s has again declined significantly. Hayley is one of the top 1,500 female names in the US today.

== Women with this given name ==
Notable people with the given name Hayley, or variant spellings of it, include:

- Hailey Abbott, American author
- Hayley Arceneaux (b. 1991), American physician assistant, bone cancer survivor and spaceflight participant
- Hailey Armstrong (b. 1996), Canadian curler
- Hayley Atwell (b. 1982), English actress
- Hailey Baptiste (b. 2001), American tennis player
- Hayley Barr (b. 1971), American actress
- Mary Hayley Bell (1911–2005), English actress, writer, dramatist
- Hayley Beresford (b. 1978), Australian equestrian
- Hailey Bieber (b. 1996), American model, media personality, and socialite
- Hailey Clauson (b. 1995), American fashion model
- Hailey Colborn (b. 2000), American beauty pageant titleholder
- Hailey Cramer (b. 1987), Australian nu-soul singer
- Hailey Danz (b. 1991), American paratriathlete
- Hailey Dawson (b. 2010), American girl with 3D-printed robotic hand
- Hailie Deegan (b. 2001), American racing driver
- Hailey Duff (b. 1997), Scottish curler
- Haylie Duff (b. 1985), American actress and singer
- Hailey Duke (b. 1985), American skier
- Hayley Elsaesser, Canadian fashion designer
- Hali Flickinger (b. 1994), American swimmer
- Hailey Gates, American model, actress, director, and journalist
- Hailey Harbison (b. 1996), American soccer player
- Hailey Hatred (b. 1983), American wrestler
- Hailey Hernandez (b. 2003), American diver
- Hayley Angel Holt (b. 1983), English actress
- Hailey Kilgore (b. 1999), American actress and singer
- Hailey Kinsel (b. 1994), American barrel racer
- Hayley Kiyoko (b. 1991), American singer and actress
- Hailey Kops (b. 2002), Israeli pair skater
- Hailey Langland (b. 2000), American snowboarder
- Hayley Lewis (b. 1974), Australian swimmer
- Hali Long (b. 1995), American-Filipino footballer
- Halie Loren (b. 1984), American singer-songwriter
- Hailie Mace (b. 1997), American soccer player
- Hayley Mackey (born 2001), New Zealand judoka
- Hayley Matthews (b. 1998), Barbados and West Indies cricket player
- Hailey McCann (b. 1995), American actress
- Hayley McDonald (b. 2008), Canadian ice hockey player
- Hayley Mills (b. 1946), English actress, daughter of Mary Hayley Bell
- Hayley Faith Negrin (b. 2003), American child voice actress
- Hayley Okines (1997–2015), English girl with rare aging disease
- Hayley Orrantia (b. 1994), American singer and actress
- Haylee Outteridge, Australian sailor
- Hailey Owens (2003–2014), American murder victim
- Haylee Partridge (b. 1981), New Zealand cricketer
- Hayley Peirsol (b. 1985), American swimmer
- Hayley Petit (1989–2007), American murder victim
- Sian Hayley Proctor (b. 1970), American geology professor, science communicator and spaceflight participant
- Hayley Raso (b. 1994), Australian footballer
- Haylee Roderick (b. 1990), American dancer, model, and actress
- Hailie Sahar (b. 1988), American actress
- Hayley Scamurra (b. 1994), American ice hockey player
- Hayley Silver-Holmes (b. 2003), Australian cricketer
- Hayley Sproull (b. 1989), New Zealand comedian
- Hailee Steinfeld (b. 1996) American actress
- Hailey Swirbul (b. 1998), American cross-country skier
- Hayley Tamaddon (b. 1977), English actress
- Halie Tiplady-Hurring (b. 1986), New Zealand rugby union player
- Hailey Tuck (b. 1990), American singer
- Hayley Tullett (b. 1973), Welsh runner
- Hailey Van Lith (b. 2001), American basketball player
- Haliey Welch (b. 2002 or 2003), American internet personality
- Hayley Westenra (b. 1987), New Zealand singer
- Hailey Whitters (b. 1989), American singer-songwriter
- Hayley Wickenheiser (1978), Canadian ice hockey player
- Hayley Williams (b. 1988), American lead singer-songwriter from Paramore
- Lee Ha-jin (b. 1988), nicknamed Haylee, Korean Go player

== Fictional characters with this given name ==
- Haley James Scott in the American series One Tree Hill
- Hailey Banks in the American animated TV series Hailey's On It!
- Hayley Cropper in the TV series Coronation Street
- Hailey Dean, titular character in the mystery series of the same name
- Haley Dunphy in the TV series Modern Family
- Hayley Ferguson in the episode "Freak the Freak Out" on the American teen sitcom Victorious
- Hailey Rogers in the film Aquamarine
- Hayley Foster in Power Rangers Ninja Steel
- Haley Houston in the film Nope (film)
- Hayley Kaplan in the game Android: Netrunner
- Hayley Long in the animated series American Dragon: Jake Long
- Hayley Marshall in the TV series The Originals
- Hailey Nichol in the TV series The O.C.
- Hailey Ruthledge in Mozart in the Jungle
- Hayley Smith in the TV series American Dad!
- Hayley Smith in the TV series Home and Away
- Hayley Stark in the film Hard Candy
- Hayley Steele in the TV series The Troop
- Hailey Upton in the TV series Chicago P.D.
- Hayley Vaughan Santos in the TV series All My Children
- Hayley Ziktor in Power Rangers Dino Thunder
- Hailey in the TV series The Other Kingdom
- Hayley the Rain Fairy, a character from the Rainbow Magic book franchise
- Hayley Haller in the TV series The Lincoln Lawyer
- Hailey Thompson, a character from the horror comic series Witch Creek Road
- Hailey in the video game Pit People

== See also ==
- Haley (given name)
- Haley (surname)
- Halley (surname), similar but unrelated name which can have the same pronunciation
- Halley (given name)
- Hailey (disambiguation)
- Haile (disambiguation)
- Hailee, given name
- Hailie, given name
- Halie, various characters in Greek mythology
