= Hailie =

Hailie is a feminine given name.

Notable people with the name Hailie include:

- Hailie Deegan (born 2001), American racing driver
- Hailie Mace (born 1997), American soccer player
- Hailie Sahar (born 1988), American actress
- Jordan Hailie Lloyd (born 1986), American reality show contestant

== See also ==
- Haley (given name)
- Haley (surname)
- Halley (surname), similar but unrelated name which can have the same pronunciation
- Halley (given name)
- Hailey (disambiguation)
- Haile (disambiguation)
- Hailee, given name
- Hayley, given name
- Halie, various characters in Greek mythology
