= Haley (given name) =

- Pronunciation: /ˈheɪli/
- Gender: Unisex (mainly female)

Origin
- Origin: English
- Region of origin: England

Other names
- Related names: Hailee, Hailey, Hayley, Hali, Halie, Halley, Haylee, Hayly

Haley (pronounced /ˈheɪli/) is an English given name, which may be either male or female.

It is derived from the English surname Haley, which in turn was based on an Old English toponym, a compound of heg "hay" and leah "clearing or meadow".

== Women ==
- Haley Anderson (born 1991), American swimmer
- Haley Augello, American wrestler
- Haley Batten (born 1998), American cyclist
- Haley Bennett (born 1988), American actress
- Haley Bishop, American actress
- Haley Black (born 1996), Canadian swimmer
- Haley Blais, Canadian singer-songwriter
- Haley Bracken, Australian model and television personality
- Haley Bugeja (born 2004), Maltese footballer
- Haley Carreau, American politician
- Haley Carter (born 1984), American soccer player
- Haley Cavinder (born 2001), American basketball player and internet personality
- Hayley Chan (born 1991), Hong Kong windsurfer
- Haley Cope (born 1979), American swimmer, also known as Haley Clark
- Haley Daniels (born 1990), Canadian canoeist
- Haley de Jong (born 2001), Canadian gymnast
- Haley Eckerman (born 1992), American volleyball player and coach
- Haley Elizabeth Garwood (born 1940), American historical novelist
- Haley Gomez (née Morgan) (born 1979), Welsh Professor of Astrophysics
- Haley Gorecki (born 1996), American basketball player
- Haley Hanson (born 1996), American soccer player
- Haley Hayden (born 1995), American softball player
- Haley Heynderickx (born 1993), American singer-songwriter
- Haley Hudson (born 1986), American actress
- Haley Irwin (born 1986), American actress
- Haley Ishimatsu (born 1992), American platform diver
- Haley Joelle (born 1999), American songwriter
- Haley Johnson (born 1981), American biathlete
- Haley Jones (born 2001), American basketball player
- Haley Kalil (née O'Brien; born 1992), American model
- Haley Kopmeyer (born 1990), American soccer player
- Haley Mack (born 1998), American ice hockey player
- Haley McCallum (born 1983), also known simply as Haley, Canadian-American musician
- Haley McCormick (born 1985), American actress
- Haley McGee, Canadian actress and comedian
- Haley McGregor, Australian runner
- Haley Cruse Mitchell (born 1999), American softball player
- Haley Moore (born 1998), American golfer
- Haley Morris-Cafiero (born 1976), American photographer
- Haley Moss, American attorney, artist, author, and advocate
- Haley Nemra (born 1989), American-born Marshallese track athlete
- Haley Peters (born 1992), American professional women's basketball player
- Haley Pham (born 2000), American YouTuber and author
- Haley Pullos (born 1998), American actress
- Haley Ramm (born 1992), American actress
- Haley Reinhart (born 1990), American singer, songwriter and voice actress
- Haley Lu Richardson (born 1995), American actress
- Haley Sales (born 1996), Canadian ice dancer
- Haley Scarnato (born 1982), American Idol season 6 contestant
- Haley Schwan, American ballet dancer
- Haley Skarupa (born 1994), American ice hockey player
- Haley Smith (born 1993), Canadian racing cyclist
- Haley Stevens (born 1983), American politician
- Haley Strode (born 1987), American actress
- Haley Tanner (born 1982), American writer
- Haley Tju (born 2001), American actress
- Haley Webb (born 1985), American actress and filmmaker
- Haley Winn (born 2003), American ice hockey player
- Haley Wollens, American fashion stylist

== Men ==
- Haley Barbour (born 1947), American attorney, politician, and lobbyist, former Governor of Mississippi
- Haley Fiske (1852–1929), American lawyer
- Haley Joel Osment (born 1988), American actor

== Fictional characters ==
- Haley Booth in the TV series Ackley Bridge
- Haley Brooks in the TV series Criminal Minds
- Haley Dunphy in the TV series Modern Family
- Haley Keller in the film Crawl
- Hayley Marshall in the TV series The Originals
- Haley Martin in the film Tarot
- Haley James Scott in the TV series One Tree Hill
- Haley, marriage candidate in the video game Stardew Valley
- Haley Starshine in the webcomic The Order of the Stick

== See also ==
- Haley (disambiguation)
- Haley (surname)
- Hailie
- Halley (given name)
- Hayley (given name), list including other variant spellings
- Killing of Hailey Dunn
