= Hailey (surname) =

Hailey is a surname, and may refer to:

- Arthur Hailey, British/Canadian novelist
- Ashawna Hailey (1949–2011), a creator of the HSPICE program
- Cedric Hailey known as K-Ci, R&B singer
- Charles Hailey, American astrophysicist
- Elizabeth Forsythe Hailey, American journalist and playwright
- Evelyn Momsen Hailey (1921–2011), Virginia State Senator
- Henry Hailey (1851–1932), English cricketer
- Homer Hailey, American preacher
- Joel Hailey, R&B singer, member of K-Ci & JoJo
- John Hailey, Congressional delegate from the Idaho Territory of the United States
- Joshua Hailey, an American privateer during the War of 1812
- Ken Hailey (born 1961), Canadian Football player
- Kendall Hailey, published autodidact
- Leisha Hailey, American actress
- Louis Hailey (1926–2019), Australian field hockey player
- Malcolm Hailey, 1st Baron Hailey (1872–1969), British peer and administrator in British India
- Nnenya Hailey (born 1994), American hurdler
- Oliver Hailey (1932-1993), American playwright
- O. E. Hailey, American politician from Idaho
- Robert Hailey (born 1951), English cricketer
- Thomas G. Hailey, American jurist

== Fictional ==
- Anita Hailey, a character in the anime and manga series Case Closed
- Winifred Hailey, a character in the Scott Pilgrim franchise

== See also ==
- Hailey (disambiguation)
- Haile (surname)
- Haley (surname)
- Halley (surname)
