= Haley (surname) =

- Pronunciation: /ˈheɪli/ (English)
- Language: English or Irish Gaelic

Origin
- Language: Old English / Old Norse / Gaelic
- Meaning: "hay clearing" or Ingenious or Claimant

Other names
- Variant forms: most common: Haly, Healy, Healey, Hailey, Hayley

Haley (/ˈheɪli/) is an English-language surname with three distinct ancestral origins, one English and two Irish.

The English surname Haley is based on a place name derived from Old English heg "hay" and leah "clearing or meadow",

The family name Haley is also a variant spelling of the anglicized Irish Healy (surname). Two ancient Irish family surnames have been anglicised as Haley.

The first of the two families has its roots in County Sligo (Irish: Sligeach), in the province of Connacht in Northwestern Ireland, where they held a family seat from ancient times. The original form of Haley is O hEilidhe, which is derived from the word "eilidhe," which means "claimant".

The second Irish family of this name arose in the province of Munster in Southern Ireland, which was formerly O hEalaighthe, derived from the Irish word "ealadhach," which means "ingenious."

Variant spellings include Haly, Hailey, Hayley, Healey and Healy, the latter being the most common forms in Ireland today.

The given name Hayley (which has many variant spellings) was derived from it.

== People with the surname Haley ==
- Alex Haley (1921–1992), African American writer
- Andrew Haley (born 1974), Canadian Paralympic swimmer
- Andrew Gallagher Haley (1904–1966), American lawyer.
- Bill Haley (1925–1981), American rock and roll musician
- Boyd Haley (born 1940), professor at the University of Kentucky
- Brian Haley (born 1963), American actor and stand-up comedian
- Cameron Hayley (born 1996), Canadian racing driver
- Carol Anne Haley (born 1972), Canadian politician
- Charles Haley (born 1964), American football linebacker
- Dan Haley (1940–2013), American football coach
- Dennis Haley (born 1982), linebacker for the Baltimore Ravens
- Ed Haley (1885–1951), American musician
- George Haley, American author and academic
- George W. Haley (1925–2015), American attorney, diplomat, and policy expert
- Gina Haley (born 1975), American singer-songwriter
- Graham Haley, African Canadian comedian
- Grant Haley (American football) (born 1979), American football player
- Harold Haley (1904–1970), murdered Californian judge
- Harold Haley (rugby league), rugby league footballer who played in the 1930s and 1940s
- Harry Hayley (1860–1922), English cricketer
- Jack Haley (1897–1979), American film actor
- Jack Haley (basketball) (1964–2015), American basketball player
- Jack Haley Jr. (1933–2001), American film director, producer and writer
- Jackie Earle Haley (born 1961), American actor
- James A. Haley (1899–1981), U.S. Representative from Florida
- James Haley (born 1985), English rugby league footballer
- James Haley, 19th century baseball player
- James L. Haley, American author of Texas history and fiction
- Jay Haley (1923–2007), American clinician
- Karen Hayley, British actress
- Ken Haley, Australian author and journalist
- Kevin Haley (born 1964), American murderer
- K. H. D. Haley (1920–1997), British historian
- Margaret Haley (1861–1939), former leader of the Chicago Teachers Federation
- Mary Hayley (1728–1808), English businesswoman
- Matt Haley (born 1970), comic book artist
- Michael Haley (rugby league) (born 1987), English rugby league footballer
- Michael Haley (soldier), Major in the South Carolina National Guard and former First Gentlemen of South Carolina
- Micheal Haley (born 1986), ice hockey player
- Mike Haley (rugby union) (born 1994), Irish rugby union footballer
- Mike Hayley, British actor
- Nikki Haley (born 1972), American Republican politician and former United States Ambassador to the United Nations
- Oretha Castle Haley (1939–1987), American civil rights activist
- Paige Haley (born 1966), American bass guitarist
- Paul Haley II (born 1988), American golfer
- Roddie Haley (1964–2022), American sprinter
- Russell Haley (1934–2016), New Zealand poet, short story writer and novelist
- Shay Haley (born 1975), African American musician
- Talon Haley (born 2006), American professional baseball player
- Thomas Alphonso Hayley (1780–1800), English sculptor, son of William Hayley (1745–1820)
- Todd Haley (born 1967), Head Coach, Kansas City Chiefs of the National Football League
- Usha Haley, Indian-born American author and academic
- William Haley (1901–1987), British newspaper editor and broadcasting administrator
- William Hayley (1745–1820), English writer
- William Hayley (priest) (1683–1715), dean of Chichester Cathedral and great-uncle of William Hayley (1745–1820)

== Fictional characters with the surname ==
- Mr. Haley, in the novel Uncle Tom's Cabin
- Lauren Haley, a character in the TV series Supergirl

== See also ==
- Haley (disambiguation)
- Hailey (surname)
- Halley (surname), similar but unrelated name
- Hayley (given name), with variant spellings
- Haile (surname)
