= Hayley (disambiguation) =

Hayley is an English given name.

Hayley may also refer to:

== People ==
- Hayley (surname)

== Places ==
- Hayley Green, West Midlands, a suburb of Halesowen, West Midlands, England
- Hayley Green, an area of Warfield, Berkshire, England
- Hayley Stadium, a speedway track in Newport, Wales

== See also ==
- Hailey (disambiguation)
- Haley (disambiguation)
- Hali (disambiguation)
- Halley (disambiguation)
