= Hali =

Hali may refer to:

- Hali Magazine
- Hali I of the Maldives (died 1268), Sultan of Maldives from 1266 to 1268
- Hali II of the Maldives (died 1288), Sultan of Maldives from 1278 to 1288
- a medieval Latinisation of Arabic Ali (also Haly)
  - Haly Abenragel, commonly known as Hali or Hali the Arabian
  - Haly Abenrudian, sometimes referred to as Hali
- Maulana Hali, the Urdu poet
- Tamba Hali (born 1983), American football player
- Tyrese Haliburton (born 2000), American basketball player
- the modern Turkish word for carpet
- Lake Hali, the fictional lake beside Carcosa
- Hali, the name of a lake in Marion Zimmer Bradley's Darkover series
- a slang term for Halifax, Nova Scotia

== See also ==
- Haile (disambiguation)
- Halie, characters in Greek mythology
- Hailey (disambiguation)
- Haley (disambiguation)
- Halley (disambiguation)
- Hayley (disambiguation)
