= Hailu =

Hailu or Haylu may refer to

- Hailu (name), part of an Amharic personal name or a Chinese surname
- Hailu (book), a Chinese description of the world published in 1820
- Hailu dialect of Hakka Chinese language
- Were Ilu, a town in north-central Ethiopia also known as Warra Hailu

== See also ==
- Haile (disambiguation)
