= Kerstin Perez =

American particle physicist

- Education: Columbia University; California Institute of Technology
- Scientific career
- Workplaces: Columbia University; Haverford College; MIT
- Thesis: Inclusive jet cross sections in proton-proton collisions at 7.0 TeV center-of-mass energy with the ATLAS detector at the Large Hadron Collider (2011)
- Doctoral advisor: Emlyn Hughes

Kerstin Perez is an associate professor of Particle Physics at the Massachusetts Institute of Technology. She is interested in physics beyond the standard model. She leads the silicon detector program for the General AntiParticle Spectrometer (GAPS) and the high-energy X-ray analysis community for the NuSTAR telescope array.

== Early life and education ==
Perez was born and raised in West Philadelphia. She studied physics and mathematics at Columbia University, earning an undergraduate degree magna cum laude in 2005. She moved to the California Institute of Technology for her graduate studies, earning a master's in 2008 and a PhD in 2011. She developed the ATLAS experiment pixel detector, and led the first ATLAS measurements of the inclusive cross-section for the production of hadronic jets. Perez returned to Columbia University as a National Science Foundation postdoctoral fellow, working in the NuSTAR Galactic Center. During her fellowship she developed outreach activities for the Columbia University Double Discovery Centre.

== Research and career ==
Perez joined Haverford College as an assistant professor in 2015, before moving to Massachusetts Institute of Technology in 2016. Her research interests lie in physics beyond the standard model. She leads the detection program for the general antiparticle spectrometer (GAPS), the first experiment that has been optimised to study low energy antinuclei. Perez is interested in anti-deuterons, antiproton-antineutron pairs which may provide evidence of the annihilation of weakly interacting massive particles, a candidate for dark matter. The GAPS detection is particularly novel, including over 1,000 large-area, low-cost lithium-drifted silicon detectors made by Perez, which can monitor exotic atom capture and decay. The GAPS experiment uses long-duration balloons and reaches the upper atmosphere.

Alongside her work on GAPS, Perez leads the high-energy X-rays analysis group for the NuSTAR telescope array. NuSTAR has revealed how stellar remnant populations vary as you move from the Galactic Center. This helps Perez identify sterile neutrinos, which could help to explain neutrino oscillation.

=== Outreach and advocacy ===
Perez is an advocate for improved diversity in science, and supports students from underrepresented groups to study and research physics. She is concerned that women and people of colour often carry an unnecessary burden in the scientific workplace. She is involved with public engagement through the Massachusetts Institute of Technology, supporting their massive open online course in electricity and magnetism.

=== Publications ===
- Perez, Kerstin "Striving Toward a Space for Equity and Inclusion in Physics Classrooms," Teaching and Learning Together in Higher Education: Iss. 18 (2016).
- B. Roach, et al., "NuSTAR Tests of Sterile Neutrino Dark Matter: New Galactic Bulge Observations and Combined Impact," Phys. Rev. D 101, 103011 (2020).
- F. Rogers, et al., F. Rogers, et al., "Large-area Si(Li) detectors for X-ray spectrometry and particle tracking in the GAPS experiment," JINST, 14, 10 (2019).

== Awards and honors ==
- 2017 Sloan Research Fellowship
- 2017 Heising Simons Foundation Fellowship
- 2018 MIT School of Science Teaching Prize for Undergraduate Education
- 2018 MIT Buechner Special Teaching Award
- 2019 Research Corporation for Scientific Advancement Cottrell Scholar Award
