= Haile Homestead =

Historic house in Florida, United States

- Kanapaha
- U.S. National Register of Historic Places
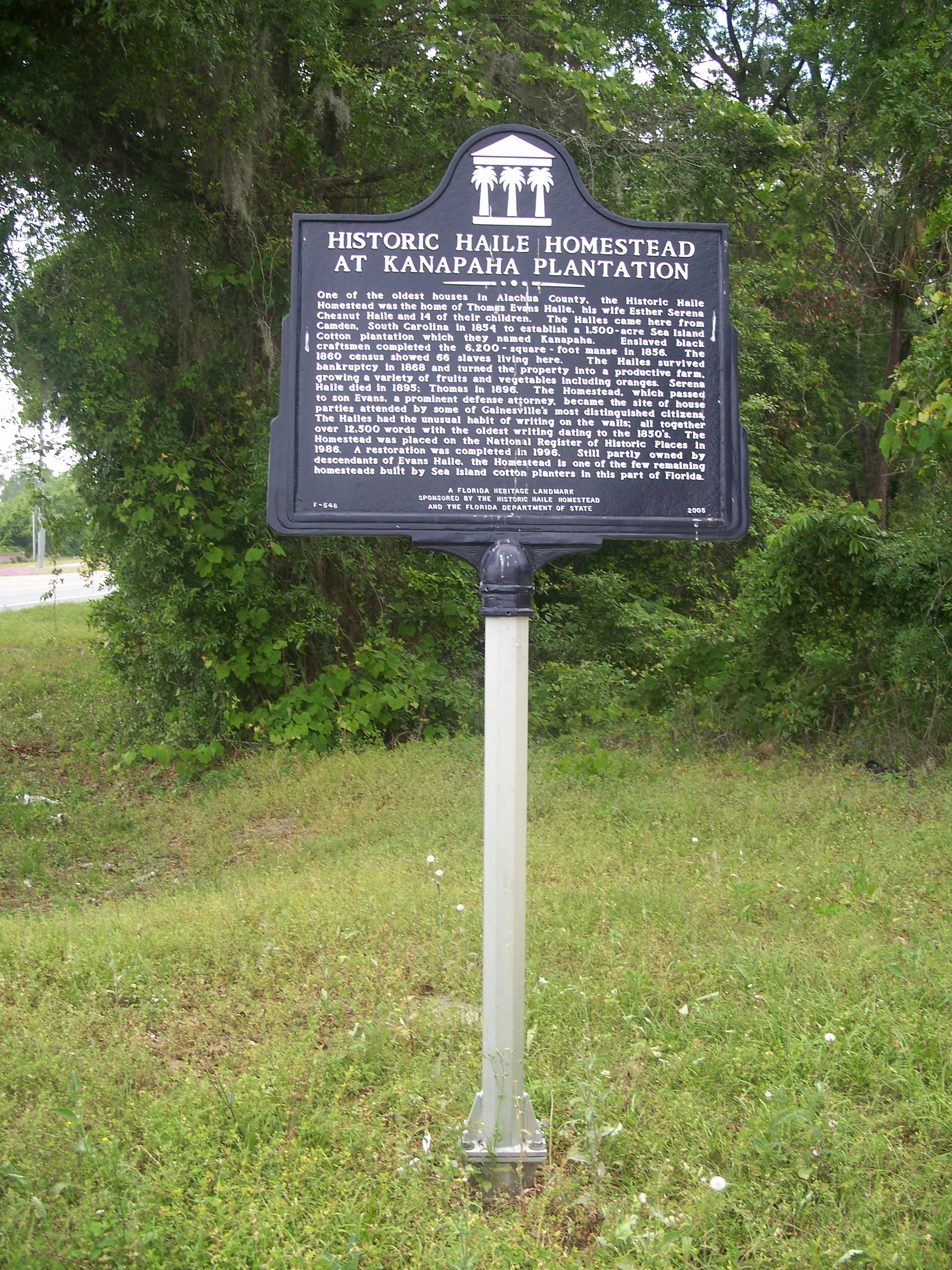
- Historic marker near Kanapaha Plantation house

- Location within Florida Location within the United States
- Interactive map showing the location of Haile Homestead
- Location: Gainesville, Florida
- Coordinates: 29°35′40″N 82°26′7″W
- NRHP reference No.: 86000915
- Added to NRHP: May 2, 1986

The Historic Haile Homestead, also known as Haile Plantation House or Kanapaha, is a historic site and museum in Gainesville, Florida, United States. It is located at 8500 SW Archer Rd. SR 24. On May 2, 1986, the plantation house was added to the U.S. National Register of Historic Places.The Homestead is unique in the Nation for its "Talking Walls." For a reason lost to time the Haile family and friends wrote over 12,500 words on the walls, dating back to the 1850s.

== History ==
In 1854 Thomas Evans Haile, his wife, Esther "Serena" Chesnut Haile, moved from Camden, South Carolina to Alachua County, Florida. There they established a 1,500-acre Sea Island cotton plantation called Kanapaha, meaning "small thatched houses". The Hailes survived bankruptcy in 1868 and turned the property into a productive farm, growing a variety of fruits and vegetables, including oranges.

Evans Haile became the owner of the land but lived in town, and after 1900 the home sat vacant for decades.

== Architecture ==
Officially known as Historic Haile Homestead at Kanapaha Plantation, the house was built for Thomas Evans and Serena Chesnut Haile in 1856 as part of their original 1,500-acre (6.1 km^{2}) cotton plantation. The Hailes brought with them from South Carolina fifty-six enslaved persons who lived in small one-room frame houses. Billy Watts was a skilled carpenter who supervised most of the homestead construction. Henry Gaines, a stonemason from the Stringfellow plantation, was responsible for building the fireplaces, chimneys and support piers on the plantation. Johnson Chestnut was a gifted carpenter and furniture maker.

Four-foot-tall piers of mortared limestone rock support a foundation of 100-foot-long beams. The house is constructed of yellow pine with cypress siding.

The house is noted for its "Talking Walls" - over 12,500 writings on its walls by members of the family and friends dating back to the 1850s.

In the late 1980s, the Haile family partnered with the Alachua Conservation Trust to restore the house. Projects include replacing the structure's current shake-shingle roof.

The museum is open for tours on weekends: Saturdays, 10 am to 2 pm and Sundays, 12 pm to 4 pm. The Allen & Ethel Graham Visitors Center and Museum was opened in 2017 and provides additional background and exhibits about the Haile family and the enslaved laborers.

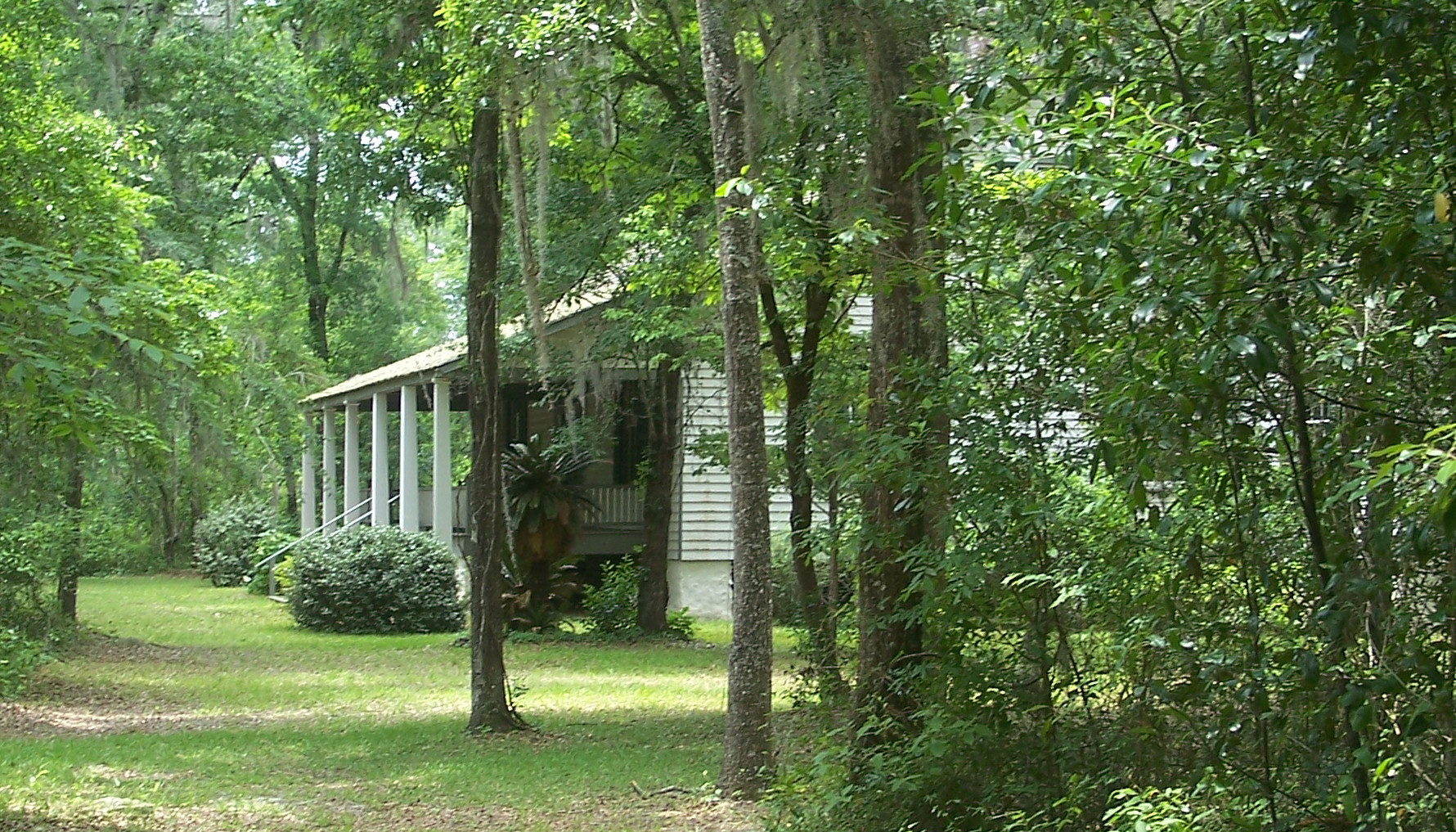
Haile Homestead

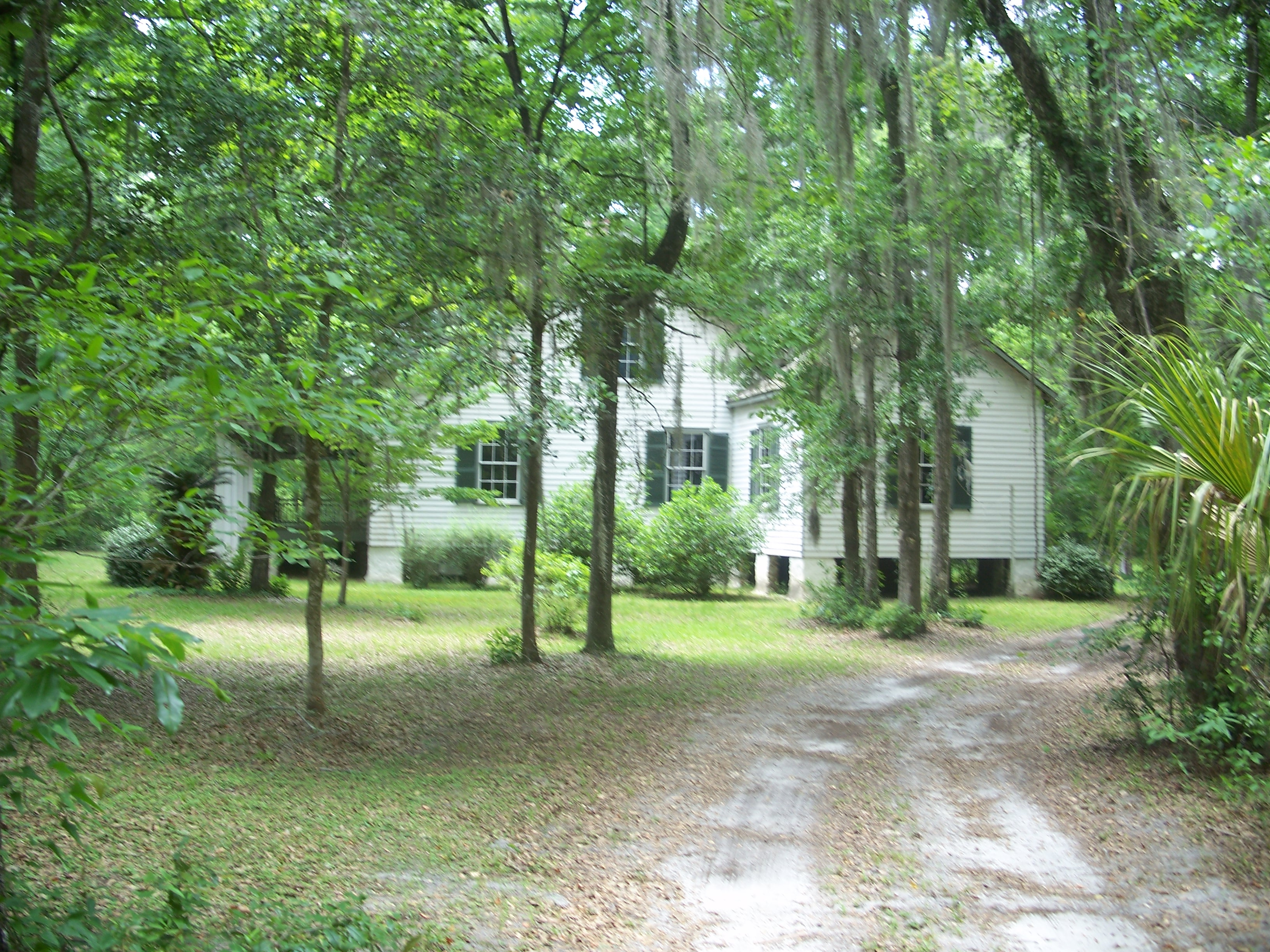
Another view

== See also ==
- Haile Plantation, Florida – New Urbanist development southwest of Gainesville, Florida
- Kanapaha Botanical Gardens – Botanical garden in Gainesville, Florida
