= Hailu (name) =

Hailu or Haylu (Amharic: ኃይሉ) is an Ethiopian name. In Ethiopian naming conventions, it may be either the first name or the patronymic of a person. It may also be a Chinese surname (Chinese: 海璐; pinyin: Hǎilù). The name may refer to the following notable people:

== Given name ==
- Hailu Ebba (born 1950), Ethiopian middle-distance runner
- Hailu Kebede (c.1893/94–1937), Ethiopian governor
- Hailu Kebede (politician), , Ethiopian politician
- Hailu Mekonnen (born 1980), Ethiopian long-distance runner
- Hailu Negussie (born 1978), Ethiopian marathon runner
- Hailu Mergia. Ethiopian keyboardist, accordionist, composer and arranger
- Hailu Shawul (born 1936), Ethiopian engineer and the chairman of the Coalition for Unity and Democracy
- Hailu Tekle Haymanot (1868–1950), Ethiopian army commander and nobleman
- Hailu Wolde-Tsadik (born 1950), Ethiopian middle-distance runner
- Hailu Yimenu (died 1991), Ethiopian Prime Minister
- Hailu Zewde (born 1974), Ethiopian middle-distance runner

== Patronymic ==
- Aynalem Hailu (born 1986), Ethiopian football player
- Befeqadu Hailu (born 1980), Ethiopian writer, activist and blogger
- Freweyni Hailu (born 2001), Ethiopian middle-distance runner
- Haftamnesh Tesfay Haylu (born 1994), Ethiopian long-distance runner
- Kassa Hailu (1818–1868), birth name of Ethiopian Emperor Tewodros II
- Kenfu Hailu, 19th century Ethiopian warlord
- Lemlem Hailu (born 2001), Ethiopian runner
- Melatework Hailu, Ethiopian politician and journalist
- Meseret Hailu (born 1990), Ethiopian long-distance runner
- Msgana Hailu (born 2005), Ethiopian middle-distance runner
- Sabla Wangel Hailu (1895/1896–1969), Ethiopian aristocrat

== Chinese ==
- Qin Hailu (born 1978), Chinese actress, screenwriter and singer
