= Haley =

Haley may refer to:

== People and fictional characters ==
- Haley (given name), a list of people and characters with this name
- Haley (surname)

== Geography ==
- Haley, Tennessee, an unincorporated community in the United States
- Haley Creek, Tennessee
- Haley Glacier, Palmer Land, Antarctica

== Other uses ==
- Haley Industries, a Canadian metal castings manufacturer
- "Haley", a 2006 single by Needtobreathe

== See also ==
- Hailey (disambiguation)
- Halley (disambiguation)
- Hayley (disambiguation)
