= Arthur Hayley =

English rugby union player

- Full name: Arthur Hayley
- Born: second ¼ 1854 Wakefield district, England
- Died: first ¼ 1947 (aged 92) Wakefield district, England

Rugby union career
Senior career
Years	Team	Apps	(Points)
–	Wakefield Trinity		
–	Yorkshire		

Arthur Hayley (second ¼ 1854 — first ¼ 1947) was an English rugby union footballer who played in the 1880s. He played at representative level for Yorkshire, and at club level for Wakefield Trinity (who were a rugby union club at the time). Prior to Tuesday 27 August 1895, Wakefield Trinity was a rugby union club.

== Background ==
Arthur Hayley's birth was registered in Wakefield district, West Riding of Yorkshire, and his death aged 92 was registered in Wakefield district, West Riding of Yorkshire.

== Personal life ==
Arthur Hayley was the older brother of Harry Hayley.
