= Halley =

Halley may refer to:

== Science ==
- Halley's Comet, officially designated 1P/Halley, a comet that becomes visible from Earth every 75-76 years
- Halley (lunar crater), a lunar crater named after Edmond Halley
- Halley (Martian crater), a Martian crater named after Edmond Halley
- Halley Research Station, a British research facility on the Brunt Ice Shelf floating on the Weddell Sea in Antarctica

== Entertainment ==
- Halley (nightclub), a defunct Argentine nightclub
- "Halley" (song), the Turkish entrant to the Eurovision Song Contest 1986
- "Halley" (film), a 2012 Mexican horror movie

== People ==
- Halley (surname), multiple people
  - Edmond Halley (1656–1742), English astronomer
- Halley (given name), multiple people
  - Halley, a pink anthropomorphic rabbit in the preschool TV series Astroblast!

== Ships ==
- Halley (ship)

== See also ==
- Haley (disambiguation)
- Halle (disambiguation)
- Hailey (disambiguation)
- Hayley (disambiguation)
- Hali (disambiguation)
