= General AntiParticle Spectrometer =

NASA experimental high-altitude balloon

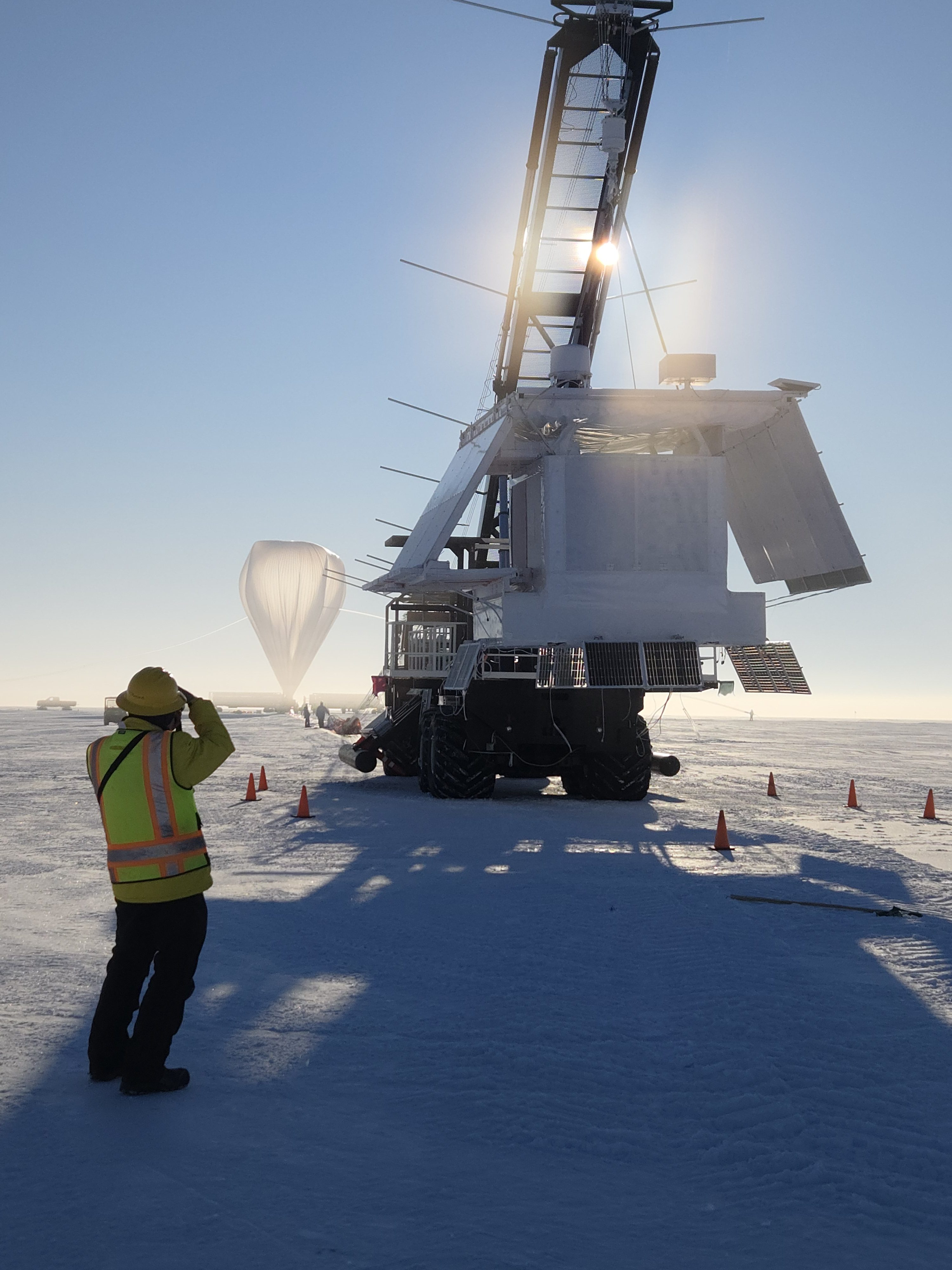
The GAPS experiment prepares to launch from Antarctica

General AntiParticle Spectrometer (GAPS) is a NASA experiment that uses a high-altitude balloon flying in Antarctica to look for antideuteron particles from outer space cosmic rays, in an effort to search for dark matter. Anti-deuterons could perhaps be produced by the annihilation of hypothetical weakly interacting massive particles (WIMPs). The goal of the GAPS experiment is to capture anti-deuterons in a target material, to form an exotic atom in an excited state. The exotic atom would quickly decay, producing detectable X-rays energies with pion signature from nuclear annihilation.

The GAPS ground test was successfully performed using a particle accelerator at KEK in 2004 and 2005. The first high-altitude balloon test was done in June 2012 with six Si(Li) detectors.

GAPS was launched from the Antarctic McMurdo Station on 16 December 2025.

== GAPS team ==
The team includes:

- Columbia University T. Aramaki, C.J. Hailey (P.I.), N. Madden, K. Mori, Florian Gahbauer
- University of California, San Diego S.E. Boggs
- University of California, Los Angeles R.A. Ong, J. Zweerink, S. A. I. Mognet
- University of Hawaii P. Von Doetinchem
- Lawrence Livermore National Laboratory W.W. Craig
- Japan Aerospace Exploration Agency – Institute of Space & Astronautical Science, N. Bando, H. Fuke, T. Yoshida
- Massachusetts Institute of Technology K. Perez

== See also ==
- 2025 in Antarctica
