= Haile =

Haile may refer to:

== Personal names ==
As a Ge'ez name, it means 'the power of'. Please note that some names in this list may be other, homonymous, names.

=== Given name ===
- Haile Selassie (1892–1975), Emperor of Ethiopia
- Haile Gerima (born 1946), Ethiopian filmmaker
- Haile Gebrselassie (born 1973), Ethiopian distance runner
- Haile Yosadiq, warlord of the Zemene Mesafint
- Haile Maryam, another warlord of the Zemene Mesafint, and father of Wube Haile Maryam
- Haile, the lead singer of British R&B trio WSTRN
- Haile Kifer, victim in the Byron David Smith killings

=== Surname ===
- Haile (surname)

== Places ==
- Haile, Cumbria, a place in Cumbria, England
- Haile Homestead, a historic site in Alachua County, FL.
- Haile Plantation, Florida, an unincorporated community in Alachua County, FL -- located near Gainesville, FL.
- Haile, FL, another unincorporated community near Newberry, FL.

== Technology ==
- Haile (robot), a robotic musician

== See also ==
- Hale (disambiguation)
- Hailu
- Hailie, given name
