= Halley Brewster Savery Hough =

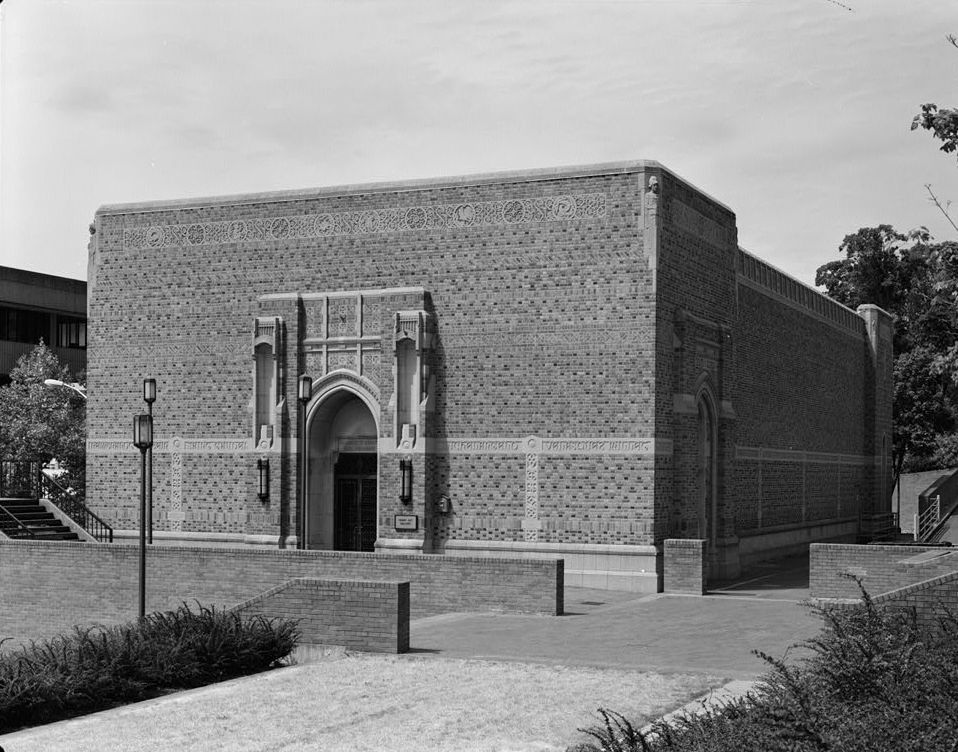
Henry Art Gallery, Fifteenth Avenue Northeast at Northeast Campus Parkway, Seattle

Halley Brewster Savery Hough (October 10, 1894 – June 19, 1967) was the first curator of the Henry Art Gallery, University of Washington.

== Early life and family ==
Helen Halley Brewster was born in Oakland, California, on October 10, 1894, the daughter of Charles Union Brewster (1862–1920) and Bertha Halley. She was the granddaughter of John Alexander Brewster, the fourth California Surveyor General, serving from 1856 to 1858. In 1908 her father invented and patented the Automatic Ruling-Machine, a machine for ruling a series of lines on lithographic stones, metal plates or in kindred processes or uses.

== Career ==
Halley Savery was a scholar of Indian, Persian and East Asian art.

From 1921 to 1924, Savery was the executive secretary of the Hearst Greek Theatre operated by the University of California, Berkeley.

From 1921 to 1926, Savery was the executive secretary of the Western Association of Art Museum Directors.

From 1924 to 1925, Savery was Assistant to the Dean of the Summer Session in Los Angeles of the University of California.

From 1925 to 1926, Savery was Extension Secretary of the Los Angeles Museum of History, Science and Art.

In 1927, Savery, together with Mildred McLough, launched "Moder-art", an organization to promote the cause of modern art interchangeably between the East and the West by means of exhibitions and lectures.

Since 1927, the year it was founded, Savery was Acting Director, and first curator, of the Henry Art Gallery, University of Washington. Until she left the position in 1948 Savery was instrumental in introducing contemporary art to Seattle.

Between 1930 and 1933, Savery curated four exhibitions: "Daumier Lithographs," "Selections from the Charles Joseph Rider Collection of Synchromist Paintings," "17th and 18th-Century Persian Costumes" and Italian paintings from the Samuel H. Kress Collection.

When Carl Morris was transferred from Spokane to Seattle in 1940 to act as assistant supervisor in charge of community exhibition galleries the advisory committee consisted of Richard Fuller, director and benefactor of Seattle Art Museum, Nellie Cornish of the Cornish School and Halley Savery.

In 1940 and 1941, Savery was chairperson of National Art Week for Seattle, Washington. The National Art Week was established by the Federal Art Project to cultivate a consumer and a greater cultural awareness of the arts across America. It was held in 1940 and 1941.

== Personal life ==
Halley Savery was a resident of Washington since 1926 and lived at 4711 15th Avenue, N. E., Seattle, Washington.

Halley Brewster married William Savery (born ca. 1875) and they had one son, James Savery (born ca. 1911).

== Legacy ==
The Halley Brewster Savery Hough papers, circa 1920–1940 are held at University of Washington Libraries, Special Collections; they consists of lecture notes, teaching materials, and related papers concerning Savery's teaching of Far Eastern art.
