= Halley (surname) =

- Language: English

Origin
- Language: Old English
- Origin: "heal"
- Meaning: "hall"

Halley is a surname of English origin, meaning: one who lived at, or near the hall in the grove or open place in a wood. The derivation is probably from the Olde English pre 7th century use of Old English heall ‘hall’, ‘large house’ + leah ‘woodland clearing’. following enforced land clearances. At the height of the wool industry in the 14th century, whole villages in Derbyshire, were cleared to make way for sheep pastures. Combined with the later 18th century Highland Clearances it is estimated that there are between seven and ten thousand such villages that have disappeared from British maps. Following the introduction of personal taxation in the 13th century, in England, surnames became required. The earliest recorded use of the surname Halley is held in the village of Beeley, Derbyshire, England, for a witness called Georgii Halley, dated 27 January 1538. The Beeley parish church records show an Anna Halley, who was christened on the 27 December 1577 and an Elizabeth Halley who married John Caleshaw on 13 August 1567.

== People with the surname Halley ==
- Antoine Halley (1593–1675), French poet
- Dave Halley (born 1986), English rugby league player
- Edmond Halley (1656–1742), English Astronomer Royal
- George Halley (footballer) (1887–1941), Scottish footballer
- Heather Halley (born 1969), American actress
- Henry Hampton Halley (1874–1965), author of Halley's Bible Handbook
- Ijah Halley (born 2001), Canadian soccer player
- Ina Halley (1927–1992), German actress
- Janet Halley (born 1952), American legal scholar
- Patrick F. Halley (1895–1956), merchant and politician in Newfoundland
- Paul Halley (born 1952), English musician
- Paul-Louis Halley (1934–2003), French businessman
- Peter Halley (born 1953), American abstract painter
- Rich Halley (born 1947), American jazz tenor saxophonist and composer
- Robert Halley (minister) (1796–1876), English abolitionist
- Robert Halley (politician) (1935–2021), French politician and businessman
- Rudolph Halley (1913–1956), American politician and attorney
- Rufus Halley (1944?–2001), Catholic missionary
- Russell Halley (1862–1909), New Zealand cricketer
- Victor Halley (1904–1966), nationalist trade unionist in Northern Ireland

== Fictional characters ==
- Sid Halley, fictional detective from Dick Francis's novels

== See also ==
- Halley (given name)
- Haley (surname), similar but unrelated name
- Halley (disambiguation)
