= Hailu Kebede (politician) =

Tigrayan political prisoner in Ethiopia

- ሃይሉ ከበደ

Head of Foreign Affairs of Salsay Weyane Tigray

Personal details
- Born: Togogwa, Tigray Region
- Party: Salsay Weyane Tigray
- Occupation: civil engineer; politician

Hailu Kebede (Tigrinya: ሃይሉ ከበደ) is foreign affairs head of Salsay Weyane Tigray, an opposition party in the Tigray Region of Ethiopia. Native from Togogwa, he publicly denounced the Togogwa bombing during the Tigray War and alerted the international media Hailu Kebede was arrested in Addis Ababa by the Ethiopian authorities on 13 August 2021. He is as a political prisoner as of 16 August 2021.

== Professional life ==
Hailu Kebede is also a civil engineer who manages a construction company.

== Politics ==
Hailu Kebede is foreign affairs head of Salsay Weyane Tigray.

== 2020-2021 Tigray War ==
At the start of the 2020-2021 Tigray War, Hailu was hiding on the outskirts of the Tigray capital, Mekele, listening to bombardment and gunfire. Later during the war, he was very vocal about war crimes:

- jointly with his fellow party members, they collected data from witnesses of killings of civilians
- he publicly denounced the Togogwa bombing and alerted the international media,
- he witnessed the euphoria in Mekelle when the town was liberated from Ethiopian soldiers
- he called for negotiations, and investigations into the looting and the massacres
- he briefed diplomats and others about the war

This is the least-documented war. The world will apologize to the people of Tigray, but it will be too late. — Hailu Kebede, foreign affairs head of Salsay Weyane Tigray, Associated Press, 11 February 2021

== Arrest ==
Hailu Kebede was arrested in Addis Ababa by the Ethiopian authorities on 13 August 2021. As of 16 August 2021, he remains in jail. The charges are: having cast his vote in the 2020 Tigray regional election, reporting ("misinforming") about the Togogwa airstrike, and participation in the Tigray War. In an interview, one month before his arrestation, Hailu said that he did not feel safe in Addis Ababa, but he insisted that he wanted the plight of the Tigrayan people to be known to the world.

On 18 August 2021, his court appearance was delayed; according to his friends, Hailu was kept in prison in order to avoid US envoy Jeffrey Feltman meeting him.
