= Haile Plantation, Florida =

New Urbanist development southwest of Gainesville, Florida

- Unincorporated Community
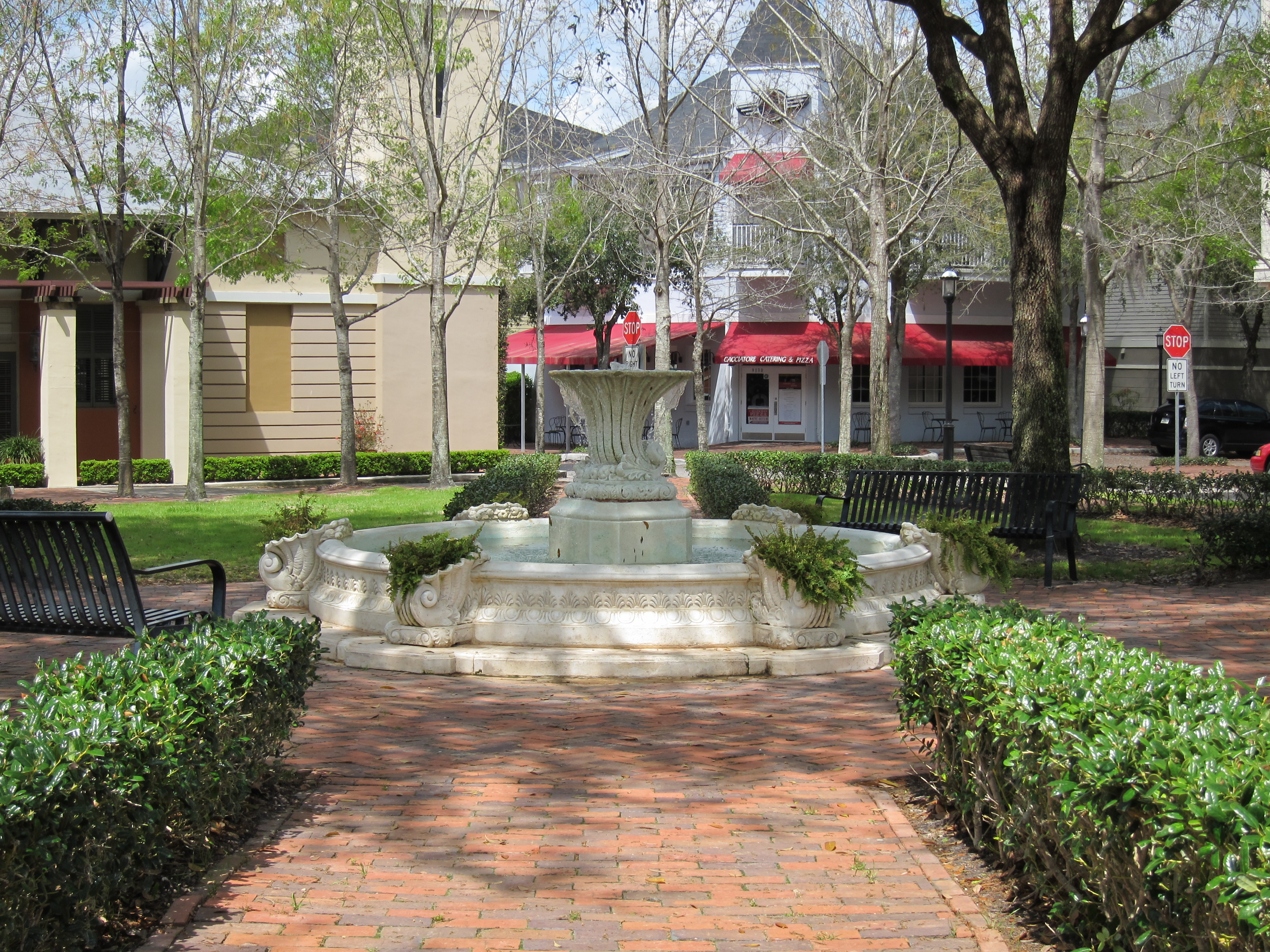
- Haile Village Center, 2010
- Interactive map of Haile Plantation, Florida
- Coordinates: 29°36′32.20″N 82°26′46.68″W
- Country: United States
- State: Florida
- County: Alachua

Area
  - Total: 1,700 acres (690 ha)
- Elevation: 85 ft (26 m)
- Zip Code: 32608
- Area code: 352
- Website: haileplantation-assoc.com

Haile Plantation, an unincorporated community and New Urbanist planned development, is a 2,600-household, 1,700-acre (690 ha) development of regional impact southwest of the city of Gainesville, within Alachua County, Florida, United States.

== Community ==
While the Village Center provides the life of the community, most residents reside within easy walking distance in one of two associations: Haile Plantation Homeowners' Association and Haile Plantation West Homeowners' Association.

Haile Village Center is the neighborhood center within the development. Residents and businesses in Haile Plantation use Gainesville for mailing addresses.

Haile Plantation also includes Publix Market Square, with multiple businesses centering on the Publix supermarket, including a UF Health clinic.

== History ==
New construction of the planned development at Haile Plantation started in the late 1970s.

=== Naming controversy ===
The development's namesake is Thomas Evans Haile, a Sea Island Cotton South Carolina planter who developed a plantation there in 1854. Enslaved African-American people lived on and worked the land. The Haile family ancestors include some who served in the American Revolutionary War. The Historic Haile Homestead, known as Kanapaha, still stands. It was featured in the 1979 movie Gal Young 'Un, based on a Marjorie Kinnan Rawlings story.

On August 1, 2020, amidst the countrywide racial unrest, CNN published an opinion piece regarding the controversy over the Haile Plantation name. The Haile Plantation West Home Owners Association formed an exploratory committee to evaluate the removal of the word "Plantation" from the name of the community. On October 26, 2020, the board of the Haile Plantation West Home Owners Association voted to keep the word "Plantation" in the name of the community.

== See also ==
- Haile Homestead – Historic house in Florida, United States
