= Russell Halley =

New Zealand cricketer

Personal information
- Born: 5 October 1862; Dundee, Scotland
- Died: 6 July 1909 (aged 46); Island Bay, Wellington, New Zealand
- Batting: Right-handed
- Bowling: Left-arm medium-pace

Domestic team information
- Years: Team
- 1886-87 to 1890-91: Canterbury

Career statistics
Competition	First-class
Matches	7
Runs scored	126
Batting average	10.50
100s/50s	0/0
Top score	29
Balls bowled	1188
Wickets	29
Bowling average	13.27
5 wickets in innings	2
10 wickets in match	0
Best bowling	5/33
Catches/stumpings	6/–
- Source: Cricinfo, 30 March 2020

Russell Halley (5 October 1862 – 6 July 1909) was a Scottish-born New Zealand cricketer who played first-class cricket for Canterbury from 1886 to 1891.

== Personal life ==
Halley was born in Dundee. After he migrated to New Zealand he was a frequent performer as a bass soloist in concerts in Christchurch. He worked as a sales representative for the firm of Sargood, Son and Ewen in Christchurch for 17 years before moving in 1898 to the firm of Bing, Harris and Co, who transferred him to Wellington around 1901.

He died at the age of 46 at his home in the southern Wellington suburb of Island Bay, leaving a widow, Bessie, and five children.

== Cricket career ==
A left-arm medium-pace bowler, at the beginning of his career in Christchurch club cricket Halley was described as a promising bowler who "bowls left hand round the wicket, delivers right at the end of the crease, and, moreover, breaks back a good bit". In a senior club match for Addington in December 1884, when one of the opposition batsmen was absent, he took 9 for 65 in an innings.

On his first-class debut against Wellington in 1886-87 he bowled unchanged throughout both innings (partnered by a fellow Scotsman, David Dunlop) to take 5 for 33 and 4 for 19 for match figures of 37.3–12–52–9 (five-ball overs). When Canterbury played the English touring team in 1887-88 he took 6 for 50 in the first innings, including four caught and bowled. In 1890 a local newspaper described Halley thus: "The best bowler of the Province, breaks both ways, and uses his head, always gets wickets."
