= Hailey Abbott =

American author

Hailey Abbott is an American author of teenage romance novels who grew up in southern California where she split her time between creative writing and the beach. She now lives in New York City.

Her first book was Summer Boys, published in 2004, the first of a series. It was described as "escapist beach reading" by School Library Journal.

== Works ==
=== Summer Boys Series ===
1. Summer Boys June 1, 2004
2. Next Summer June 1, 2005
3. the After Summer September 1, 2006
4. Last Summer May 1, 2007

=== Summer Girls Series ===
1. Summer Girls May 2009
2. Girls in Love May 2010

=== Other books ===
- The Bridesmaid May 24, 2005
- The Secrets of Boys May 30, 2006
- Getting Lost with Boys June 12, 2007
- The Perfect Boy April 24, 2007
- Waking Up to Boys May 29, 2007
- Forbidden Boy April 22, 2008
- The Other Boy May 27, 2008
- Boy Crazy April 28, 2009
- Flirting With Boys April 28, 2009 ISBN 978-0061253843
