= Ken Haley =

Ken Haley (born 1954 in Melbourne, Victoria) is an Australian author and journalist who became paraplegic in 1991.

Haley's books include: Emails from the Edge, Europe at 2.4 km/hour, and The One That Got Away. He has written for publications including The Guardian, Australia's The Age and the South China Morning Post.
