= Hailey =

Hailey may refer to:

== People ==
- Hailey (given name)
- Hailey (surname)

== Places ==
- Hailey, Idaho, USA
- Hailey, Missouri, USA
- Hailey, Hertfordshire, England
- Hailey, Oxfordshire, England
- Green Hailey, Buckinghamshire, England
- Hailey College of Commerce, Lahore, Punjab, Pakistan

== Other uses ==
- Baron Hailey, title created in the United Kingdom for the former governor of Punjab
- USS Hailey (DD-556), a destroyer for the United States Navy
- "Hailey", a track on The Complete Edition of Justin Bieber's album Justice, titled after his wife, Hailey Baldwin
- Hailey's On It!, a Disney Channel animated TV series
- Hailey, a brand name of ethinylestradiol/norethisterone acetate, a combined oral contraceptive

== See also ==
- Haley (disambiguation)
- Halley (disambiguation)
- Hayley (disambiguation)
