= Henry Hailey =

English cricketer

Personal information
- Full name: Henry Hailey
- Born: 7 April 1851; Limehouse, London, England
- Died: 24 September 1932 (aged 81); Southend-on-Sea, Essex, England
- Batting: Right-handed

Domestic team information
- Years: Team
- 1894–1895: Essex

Career statistics
Competition	First-class
Matches	13
Runs scored	301
Batting average	17.70
100s/50s	–/2
Top score	66*
Balls bowled	–
Wickets	–
Bowling average	–
5 wickets in innings	–
10 wickets in match	–
Best bowling	–
Catches/stumpings	5/–
- Source: Cricinfo, 31 October 2011

Henry Hailey (7 April 1851 – 24 September 1932) was an English cricketer. Hailey was a right-handed batsman. He was born at Limehouse, London.

Hailey made his first-class debut for Essex against Leicestershire in the 1894 County Championship. He made twelve further first-class appearances for Essex, the last of which came against Leicestershire in the 1895 County Championship. In his thirteen first-class appearances, he scored 301 runs at an average of 17.70, with a high score of 66 not out. This score, which was one of two first-class fifties he made, came against the Marylebone Cricket Club at Lord's in 1895.

He died at Southend-on-Sea, Essex on 24 September 1932.
