= Kevin Haley =

American murderer and suspected serial killer

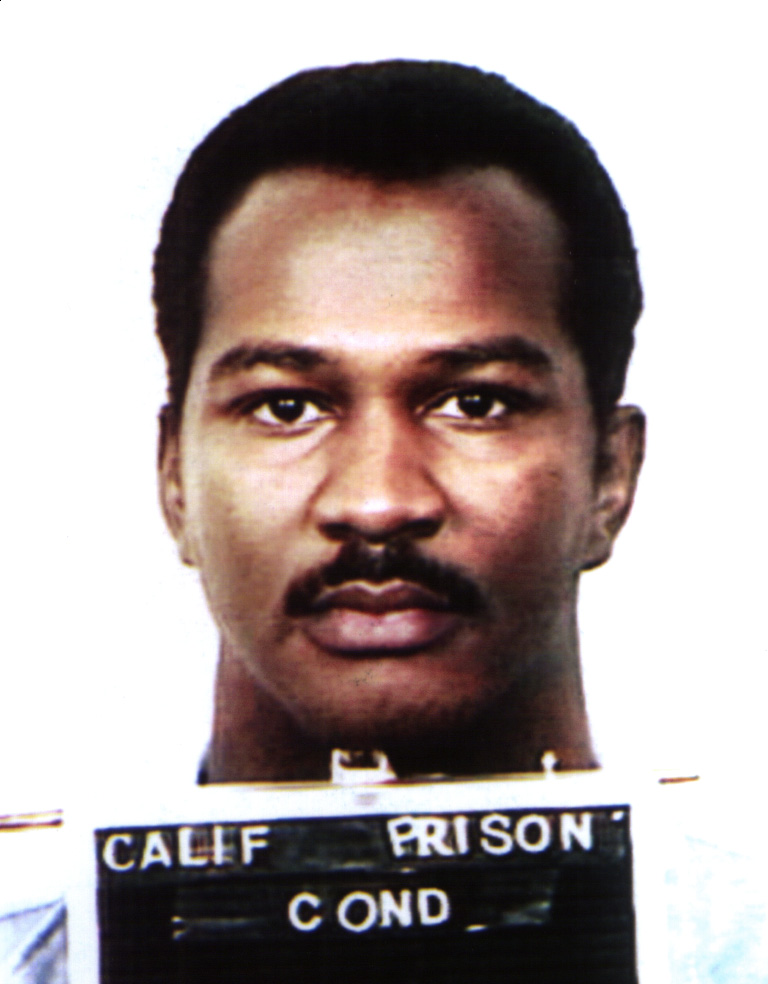
- Born: Kevin Bernard Haley; October 21, 1963 (age 62); Memphis, Tennessee, U.S.
- Convictions: First degree murder with special circumstances ×2; Rape; Burglary; Robbery
- Penalty: Death ×2

Details
- Victims: 2–8
- Span of crimes: April – September 1984
- Country: United States
- State: California
- Date apprehended: October 9, 1984
- Imprisoned at: Calipatria State Prison, Calipatria, California

Kevin Bernard Haley (born October 21, 1963) is an American murderer, rapist, burglar and suspected serial killer who, together with his older brother Reginald, committed a series of violent crimes in the Los Angeles area from 1982 to 1984, resulting in at least two murders. Suspected in a total of eight murders, Kevin Haley was convicted of two counts of murder in separate trials, receiving death sentences on each count.

== Early life ==
Kevin Haley was born on October 21, 1963, in Memphis, Tennessee. He was the younger of two brothers, with his older brother Reginald being born in 1960. Around 1965, the Haley family moved to Los Angeles, California, where the two brothers eventually began living criminal lifestyles. In the early 1980s, the pair developed an addiction to crack cocaine, which investigators would later claim was the main reason as to why the brothers started killing. At the time of the crimes, Kevin worked as a dog groomer.

== Exposure ==
On September 28, 1984, Haley was arrested in Los Angeles on a burglary charge. He was then questioned about the murder of 55-year-old Dolores Clement, who had been raped and murdered at her home on the previous day. Haley denied any involvement and was subsequently released, but a sample of his fingerprints were taken and later matched to the crime scene. As a result, he was re-arrested by police officers at his own home on October 9. He was later charged with the rape-murder of 56-year-old Laverne Stolzy, who was found dead at her home on June 25.

During the course of the investigation, the Los Angeles County District Attorney's Office examined testimonies, performed ballistics tests and searched several properties/cars – as a result, they came to the conclusion that the Haley brothers were responsible for eight murders, approximately 500 burglaries and at least 60 assaults on women involving rape from 1979 to 1984, primarily in the Venice and Mid-Wilshire neighborhoods. During interrogations, the brothers partially admitted that they were responsible for the burglaries and assaults, but adamantly insisted that they were not murderers. By November 9, Kevin Haley had confessed to committing six rapes and 53 burglaries, according to LAPD detectives Woody Parks and Jim McCain.

According to investigators, the Haleys were responsible for the following murders:

- D. Robinoff, 78: raped and beaten to death in her home on 1000 South Hayworth Avenue on April 20, 1984.
- Isabel Buxton, 90: robbed and beaten to death at her home on 1500 Andalusia Avenue on April 20, 1984
- Jodie Samuels, 15: robbed and shot to death while waiting at a bus stop on 4900 West 23rd Street on May 12, 1984.
- T. Okauchi, 88: robbed and beaten to death on August 4, 1984, at her home on 1200 South Manhattan Place.
- Elizabeth Karp, 89: beaten and strangled on 8700 West Olympic Boulevard, exact date was never released
- Elizabeth Burns, 79: raped and murdered at her home on 300 Reeves Drive in Beverly Hills, exact date was never released.

During a November 1984 press conference, LAPD Police Chief Daryl Gates said that these were some of the most brutal crimes committed against elderly women in the history of the city.

== Prosecution ==
In 1987, Reginald Haley was convicted of a series of rapes, kidnappings, robberies, and burglaries, for which he was sentenced to life imprisonment with a chance of parole after 30 years. In the meantime, Kevin Haley was charged with the murders of Jodie Samuels, Dolores Clement and Laverne Stolzy. His trial began in May 1988, and lasted only three weeks.

During the trial, the jury listened to a tape recording of Kevin's confession to the murder of Clement and were shown a diagram of the crime scene drawn by him. This, accompanied by the fact that his fingerprints were found at the crime scene, convinced them that he was indeed guilty and he was subsequently convicted of raping and killing Clement on June 6, 1988. Deliberations began on May 24 of the following year, with jurors being deadlocked on whether he had killed Stolzy. Because of this, they voted 9-to-3 in favor of an acquittal in the Stolzy murder, due to a lack of evidence. In regards to the murder of Clement, Haley was sentenced to death in September of that year.

== Aftermath ==
=== Retrial and new conviction ===
Following his conviction, Kevin Haley was transferred to San Quentin State Prison's death row to await execution. After spending 16 years behind bars, he and his attorneys filed an appeal in 2004, arguing that the murder of Clement was accidental and that it constituted involuntary manslaughter. He also claimed that the interrogating officers had violated his Miranda rights, as they pressured him to confess under the threat of death and while he was under the influence of drugs. While the courts disagreed with a majority of the claims, Haley's death sentence was nonetheless overturned, and on August 27, 2004, he was granted a new trial. However, at the second trial, the District Attorney's Office refused to downgrade the charges to manslaughter and again charged Haley with first-degree murder. He was therefore found guilty yet again, and his death sentence was reinstated.

In the early 2010s, DNA testing was conducted on biological traces found on the body of Laverne Stolzy. The results showed a match to the genotypic profile of Kevin Haley, after which the District Attorney's Office filed an appeal to overturn his acquittal, which was granted. In 2014, Haley was extradited to Los Angeles to face trial for the murder of Stolzy, and on October 8, he was found guilty and received a second death sentence. At the trial, Haley decided to represent himself, but presented no mitigating evidence, pleaded not guilty and did not make a closing argument during the penalty phase, due to which the jury rejected the option of life imprisonment without parole. There were also plans to charge him with the murder of Jodie Samuels and the assault of Wilma Gelber, who had been shot 75 minutes prior to the murder of Samuels – it was later determined that both had been shot with the same weapon. However, as said weapon was never found and a witness to the murder of Samuels could not positively identify Haley as her killer, he was never charged in either case.

As of June 2026, both brothers remain incarcerated – Kevin Haley is at the Calipatria State Prison, while Reginald is at the California Health Care Facility. In February 2019, after serving more than 31 years in prison, Reginald Haley applied for parole, but was denied and barred from applying until 2022. In February of that year, he filed a second application, but was denied yet again and remains behind bars.

== See also ==
- Capital punishment in California
- List of death row inmates in the United States § California
