= Haley Creek =

Stream in Tennessee, USA

- Haleys Creek
- Location within Tennessee
- Location: Tennessee, USA
- Coordinates: 35.622848°N 88.290597°W
- Type: Creek

Haley Creek is a stream in the U.S. state of Tennessee. It is a tributary to the Beech River.

Haley Creek was the name of a pioneer settler. A variant name was "Haleys Creek".
