= Haylee Partridge =

New Zealand cricketer (born 1981)

Haylee Joanne Partridge (born 3 April 1981 in Lower Hutt) is a New Zealand cricketer who played 21 State League matches for the Northern Districts Spirit between 1999 and 2002.
