= Kanapaha Botanical Gardens =

Botanical garden in Gainesville, Florida

Coordinates: 29.6122°N 82.4089°W

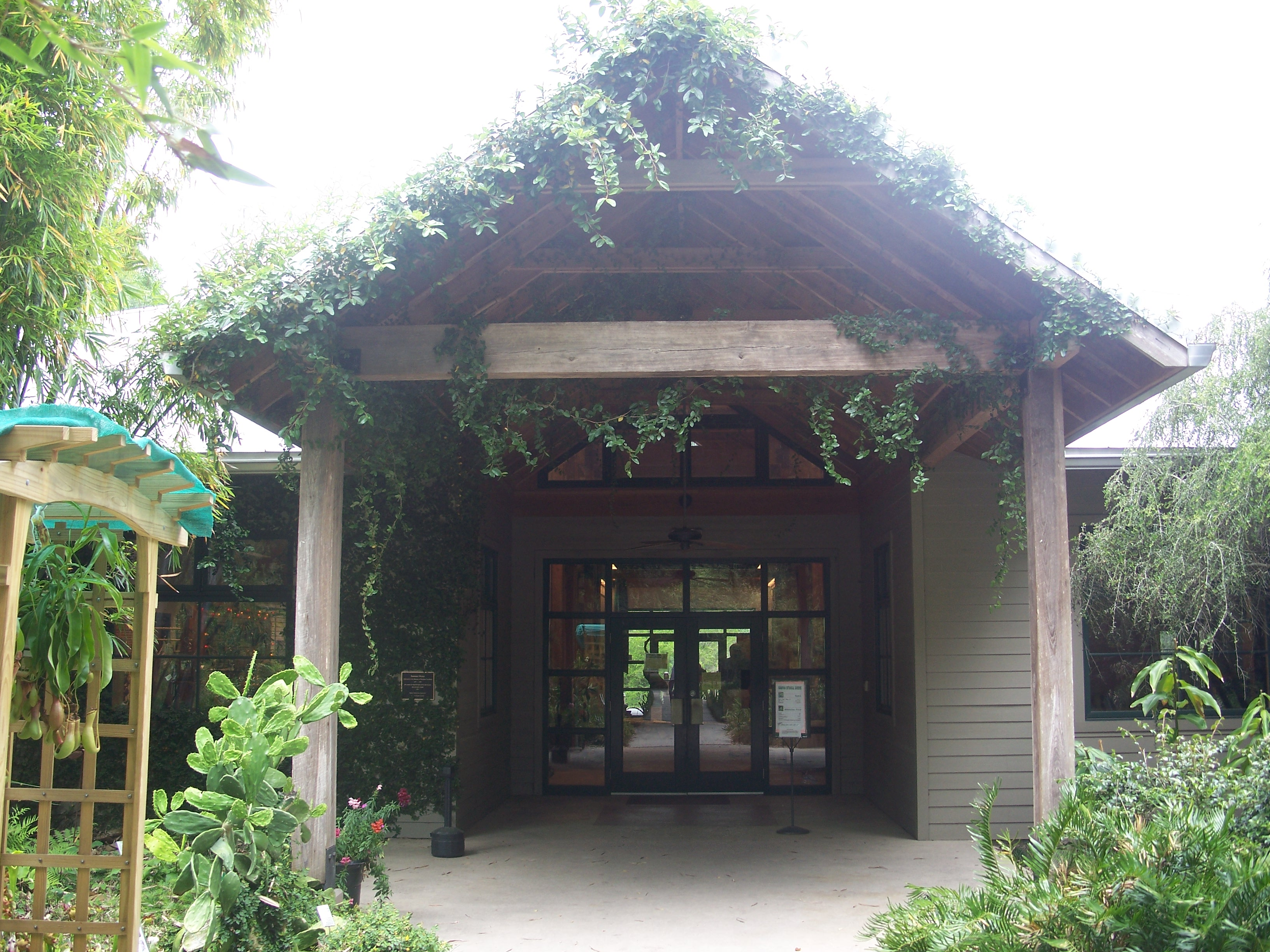
- Entrance
- Interactive map of Kanapaha Botanical Gardens
- Location: Gainesville, Florida
- Owner: North Florida Botanical Society
- Website: kanapaha.org

The Kanapaha Botanical Gardens (62 acres, 25 hectares) is a botanical garden in Gainesville, Florida, operated by the North Florida Botanical Society. The name for the garden comes from the nearby 250-acre Lake Kanapaha. "Kanapaha" originating from two Timucua words for "palmetto leaves" and "house". The gardens were established in 1978 when the society leased 33 acres (13.4 hectares) for a public botanical garden. Another 29 acres (11.7 hectares) were added in 1982. The gardens opened to the public in 1986.

As of 2005, the Kanapaha Botanical Gardens contain Florida's largest public bamboo gardens and the largest herb garden in the Southeast.

== History ==
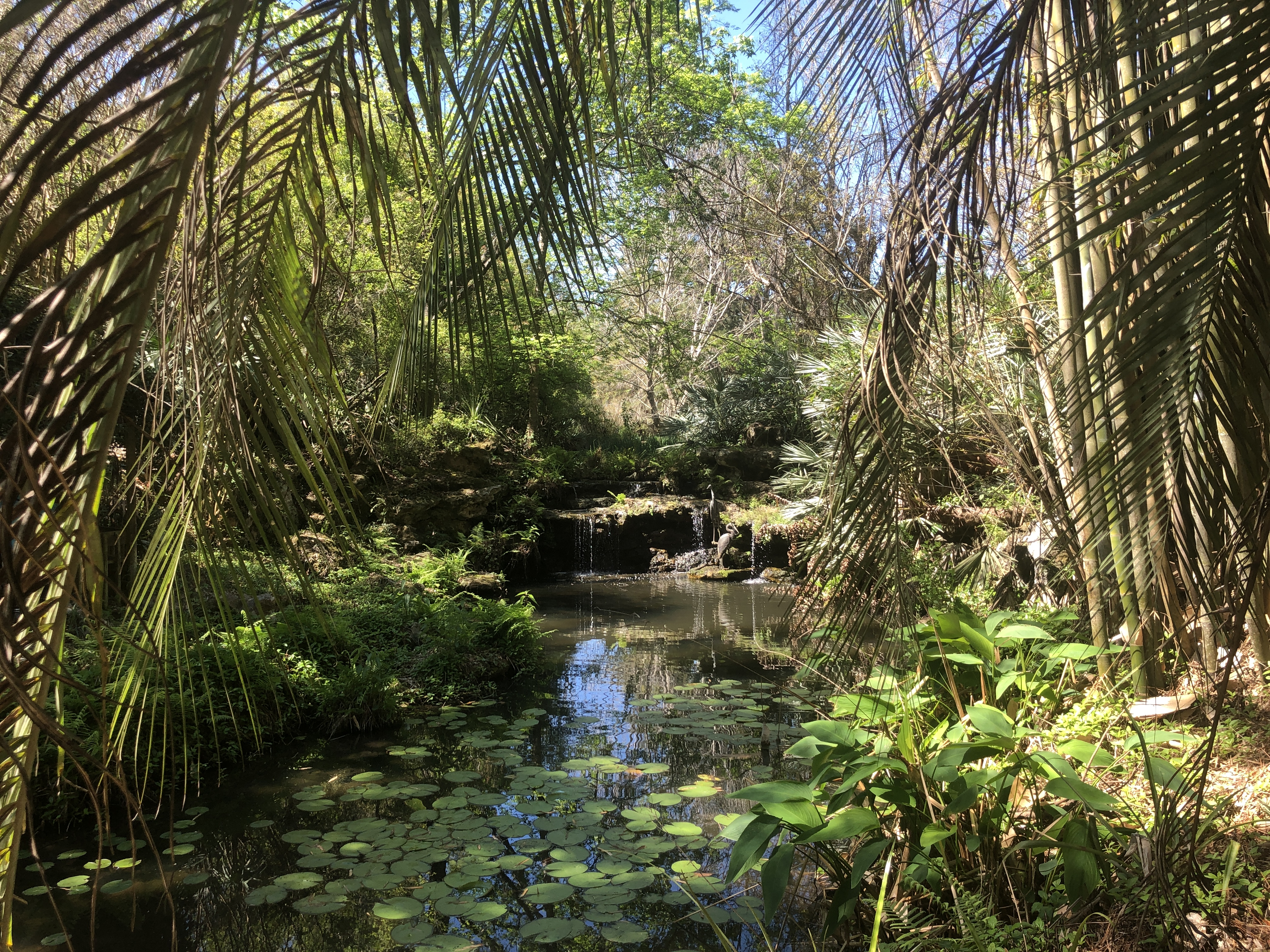
Overlook of a waterfall.

The North Florida Botanical Society, a private non-profit organization, was formed on September 16, 1977. They had a goal of creating a botanical garden in the North Florida area. A request was made to the Alachua County Commission for a 33-acre are of land for use in developing the botanical garden, which was unanimously approved. A 90-year renewable lease was negotiated, in which the Society would pay $1 a year. Work on the gardens would officially begin on March 7, 1978. An additional request for 29 acres to create an Arboretum was made in March 1981. Impressed by the progress made in the original area, the Alachua County Commission approved the additional land request.

Development of the area lasted from March 7, 1978, to the official public opening on October 16, 1986. Ten gardens were created during this period, including a one-mile loop of paved walkway going through them, an extensive irrigation system, six gazebos, and two boardwalks overlooking the largest sinkholes. The community assisted in the construction of the gardens through the help of several private donors who provided materials and equipment for the project. The entrance building containing the gift shop was also part of a donation, which was renovated due to a grant provided by a private Scottish horticultural trust. Public work grants allowed the hiring of the workforce, many being affiliated with what was the Comprehensive Employment Training Agency (C.E.T.A.) until it closed. After 1983, the gardens had to rely on community service workers.

Since 1990, the gardens have held an annual Spring Garden Festival in March. Additionally, an annual Open House & Fall Plant Sale has been held in October since 1995, in conjunction with the Gainesville Orchid Society since 2008.

== Collections ==
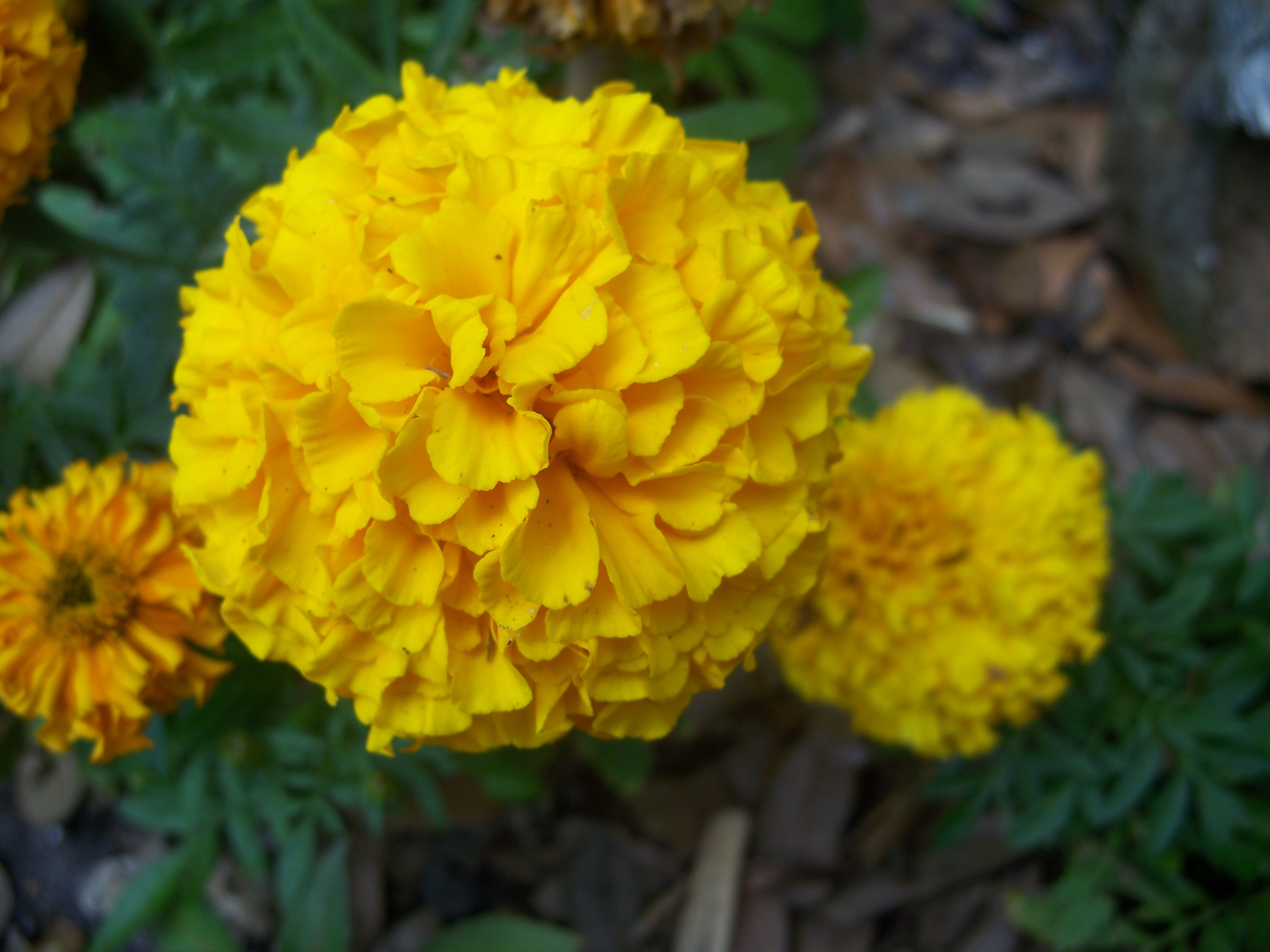
Tagetes erecta.

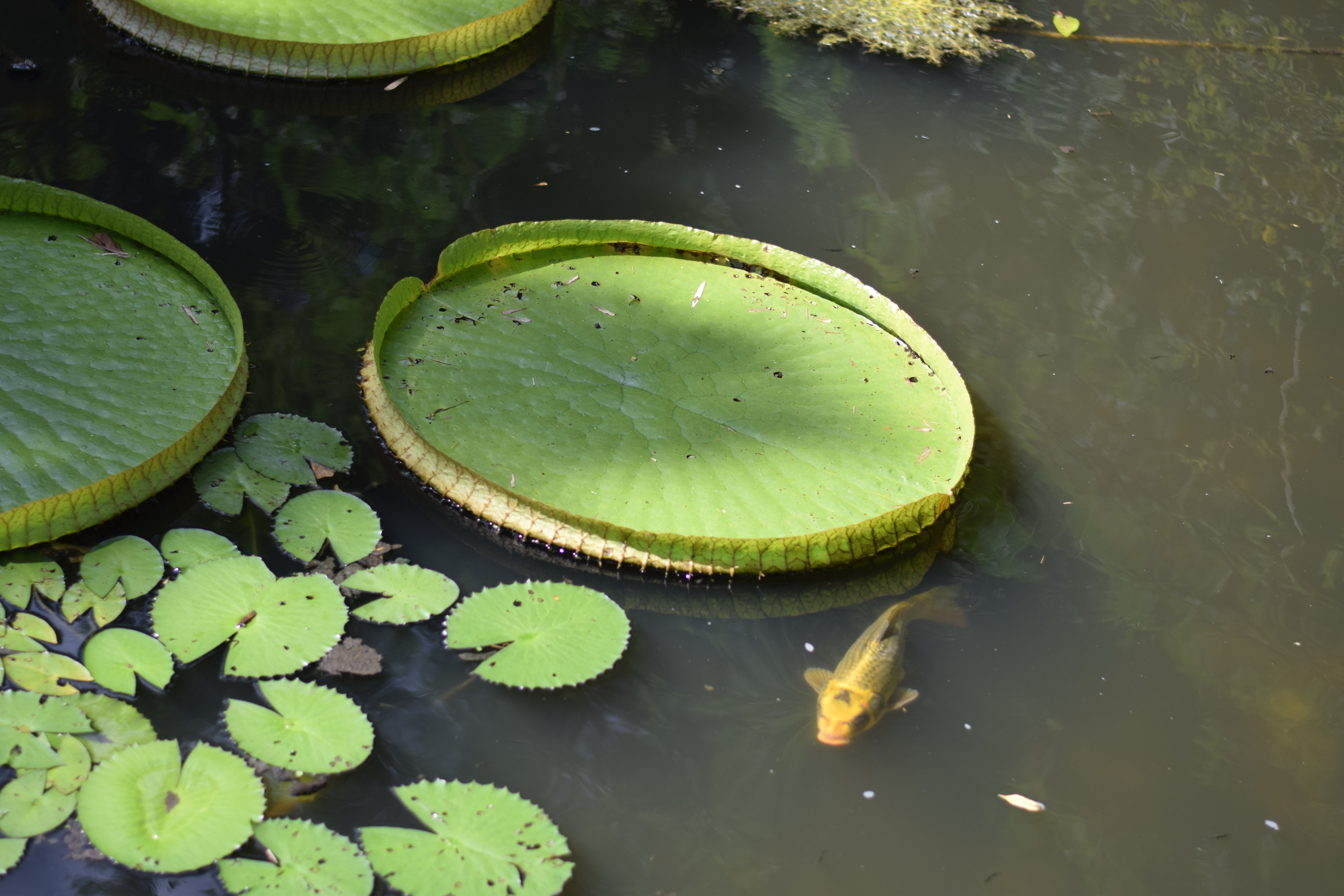
Victoria amazonica.

The gardens include the following major collections:

- Arboretum
- Azalea/Camellia garden
- Bamboo garden
- Butterfly garden
- Crinum garden
- Cycad garden
- Fern cobble
- Herb garden
- Hummingbird garden
- Palm hammock
- Rock garden
- Rose garden
- Spring flower garden
- Vinery
- Woodland garden

=== Bamboo Collection ===
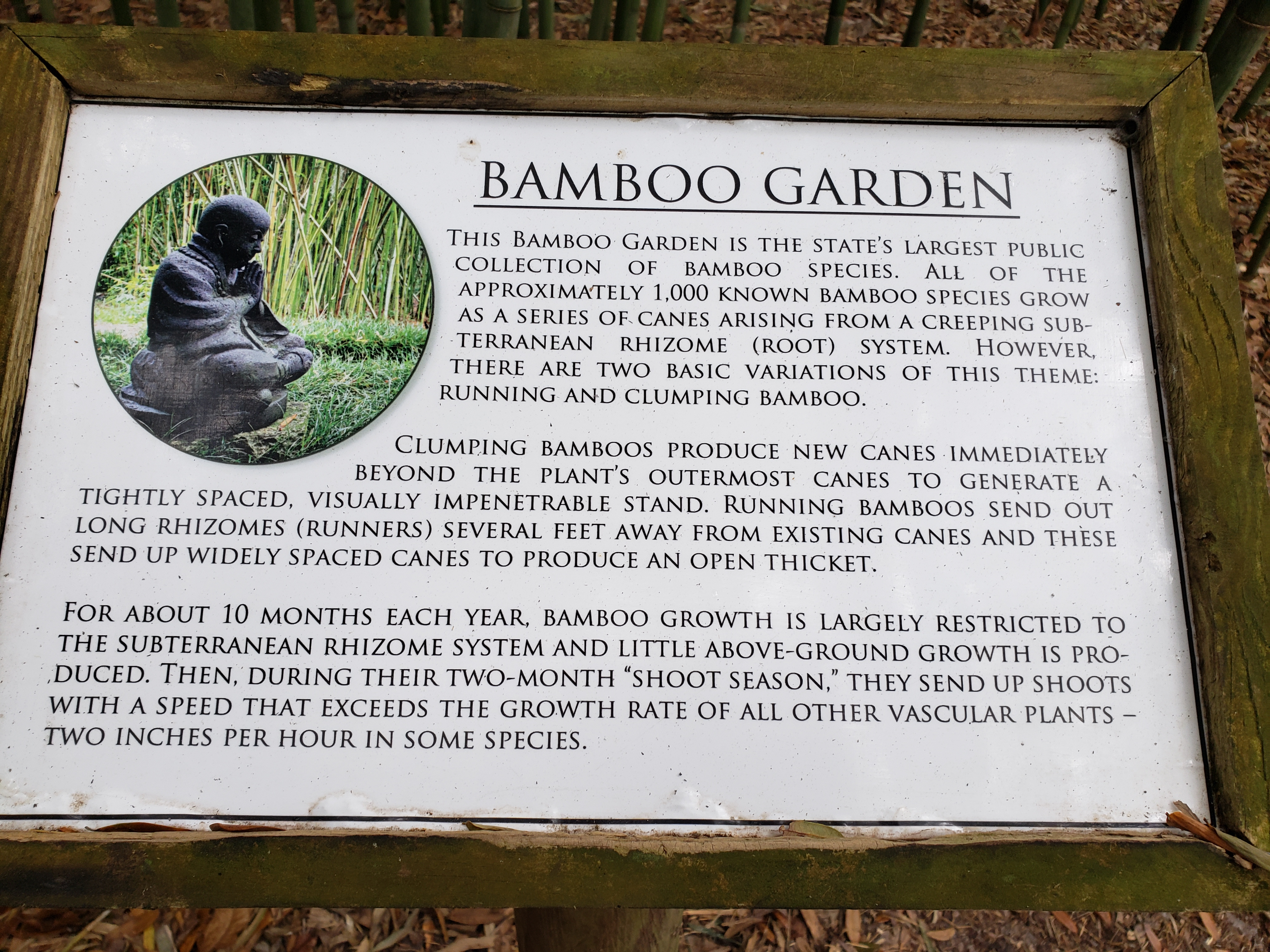
Kanapaha Bamboo Garden

Each spring, Kanapaha Botanical Gardens hosts a bamboo sale for the public. The bamboo garden consists of exotic bamboo species. Examples of bamboo species found are the following:

- Giant Timber Bamboo (Bambusa Oldhamii)
- Variegated Buddha's Belly Bamboo (Bambusa ventricosa kimmei)
- Muddy Bamboo (Bambusa dissimulator)
- Seabreeze Bamboo (Bambusa malingensis)
- White Bamboo (Phyllostachys nigra var henonis)
- Stripestem Bamboo (Bambusa multiplex 'Alphonse Karr')
- Blue Bamboo (Bambusa chungli)
- Black Bamboo (Phyllostachys nigra)
- Lemon Lime Bamboo (Bambusa eutuldoides)

== Gallery ==
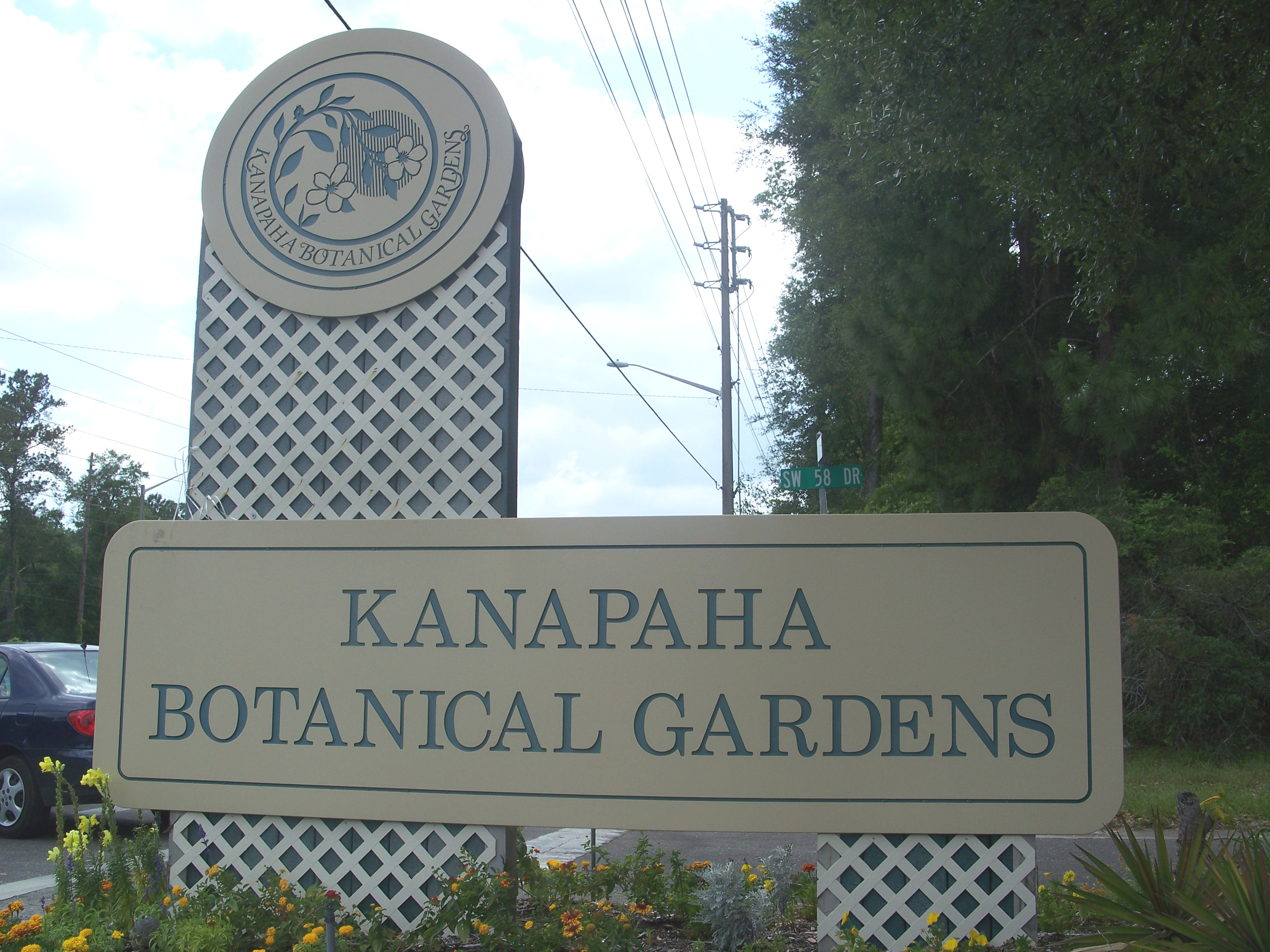
Entrance on Archer Road.

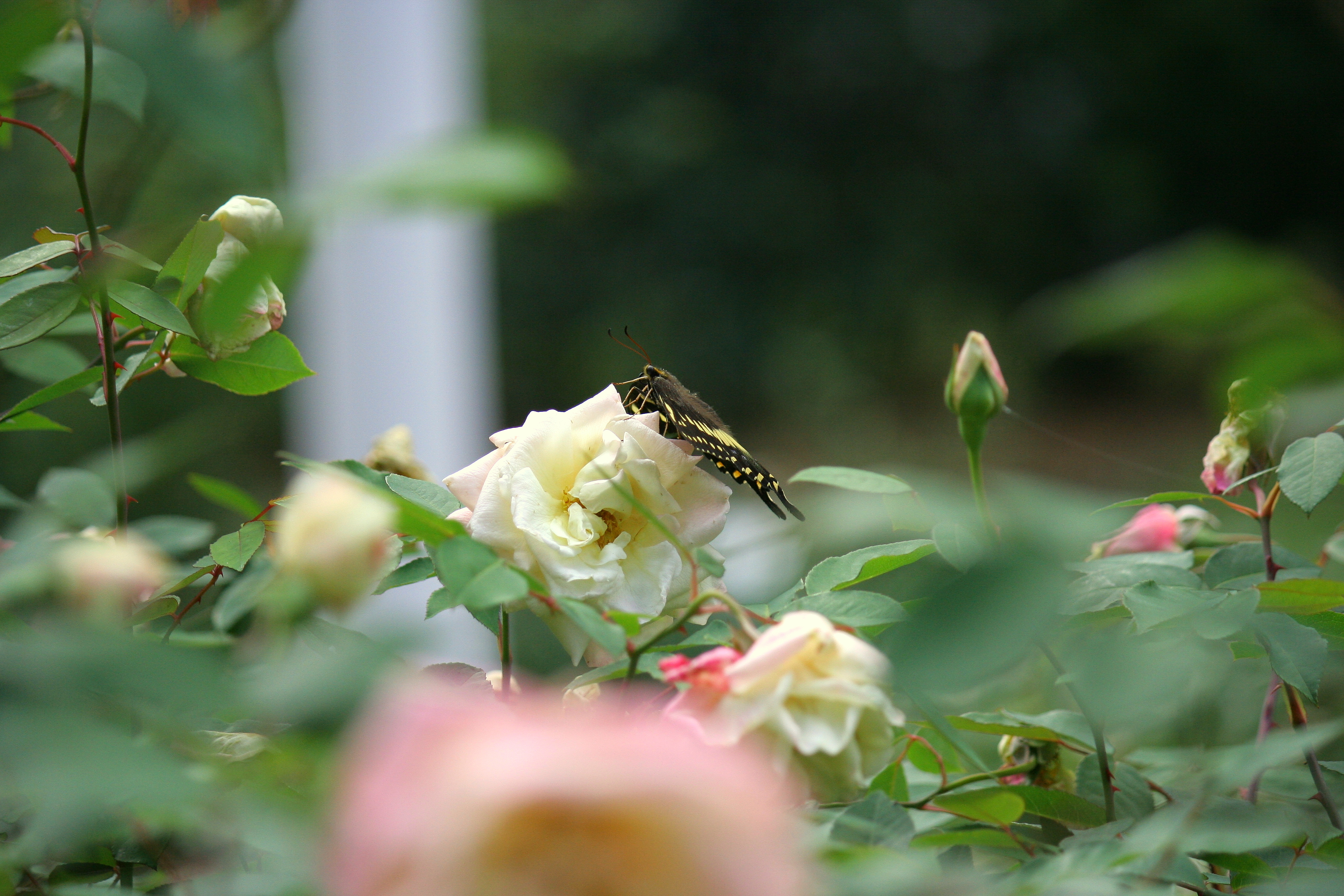
Swallowtail butterfly resting on a rose in the rose garden.

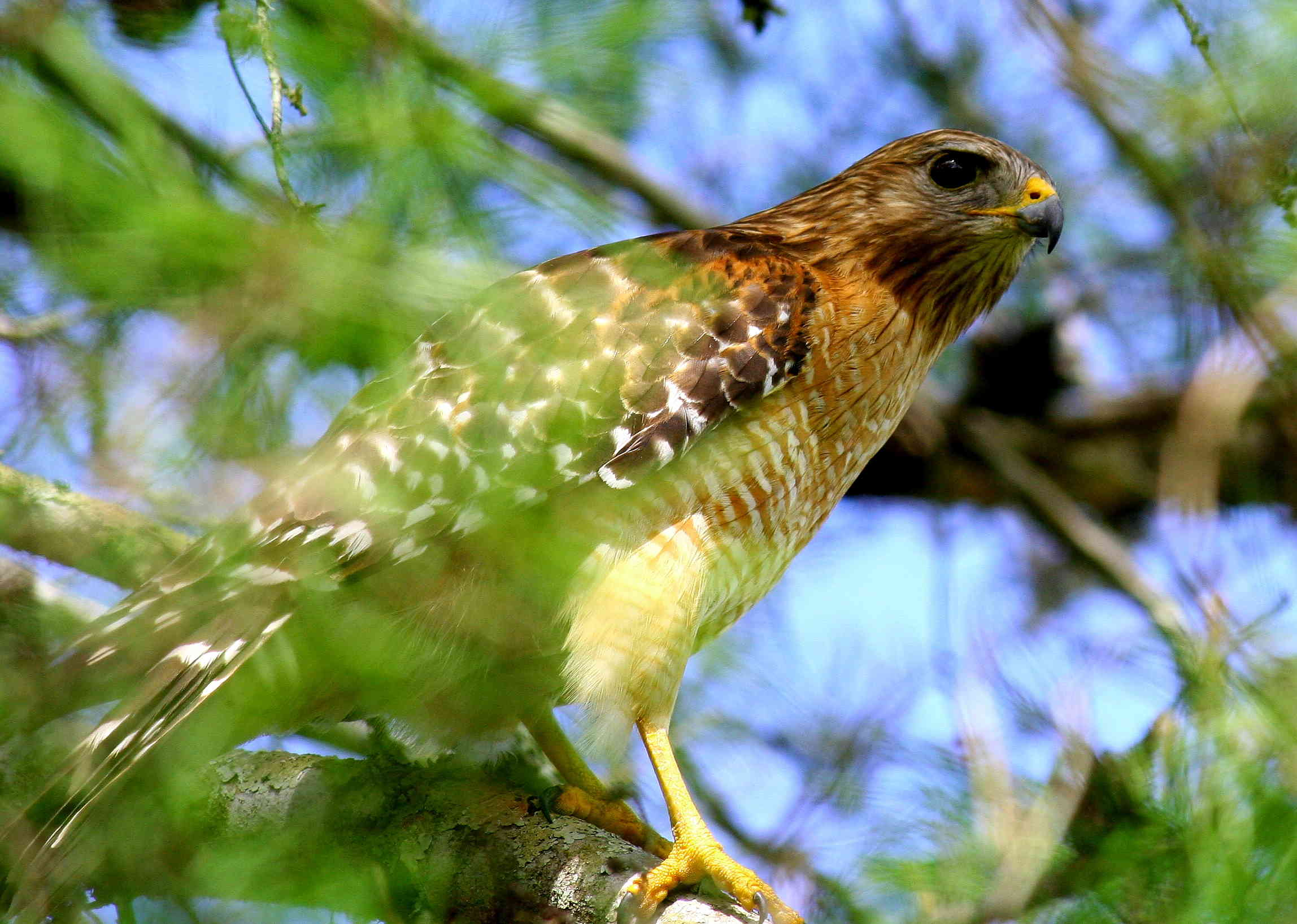
Red-shouldered hawk.

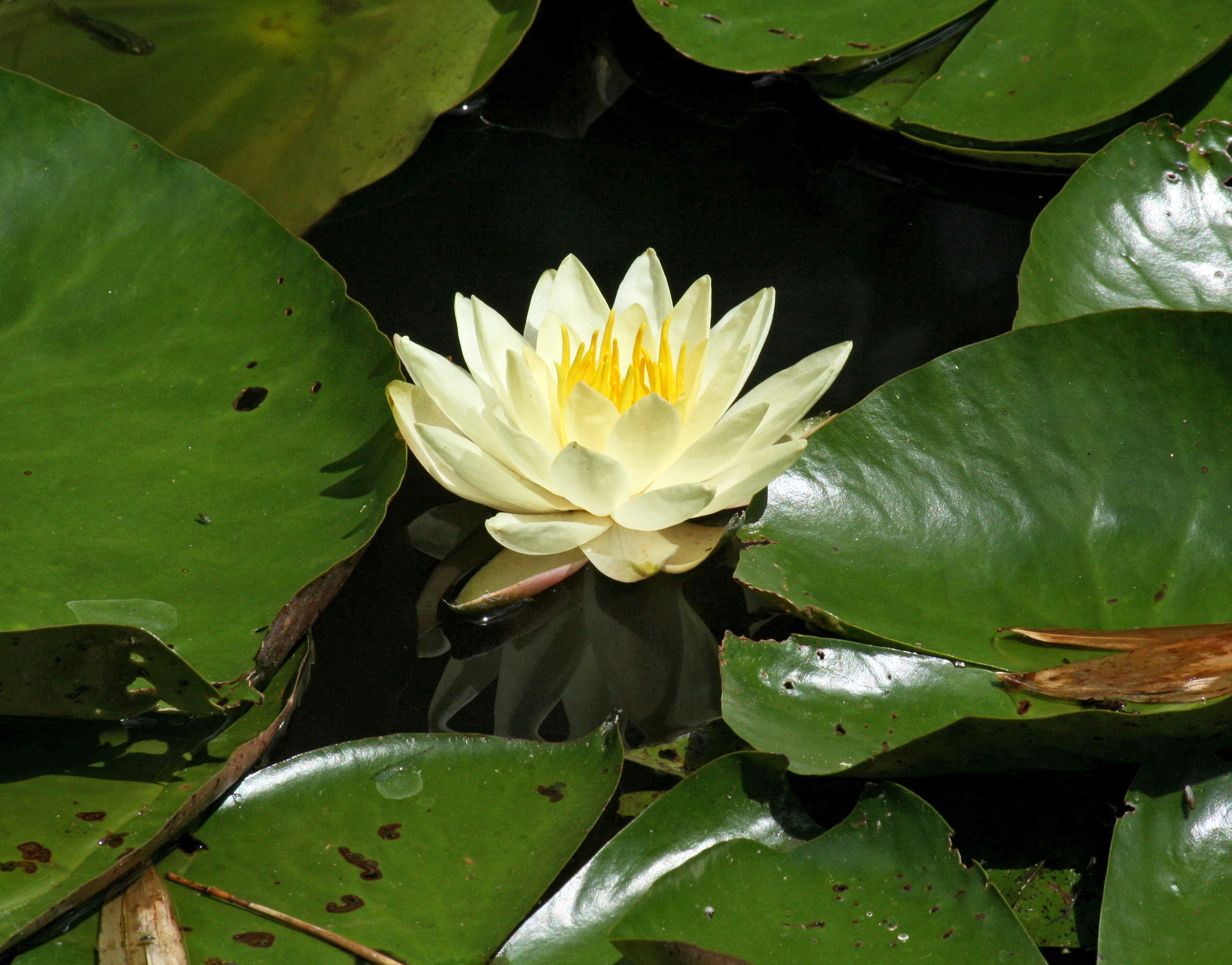
Nymphaea alba.

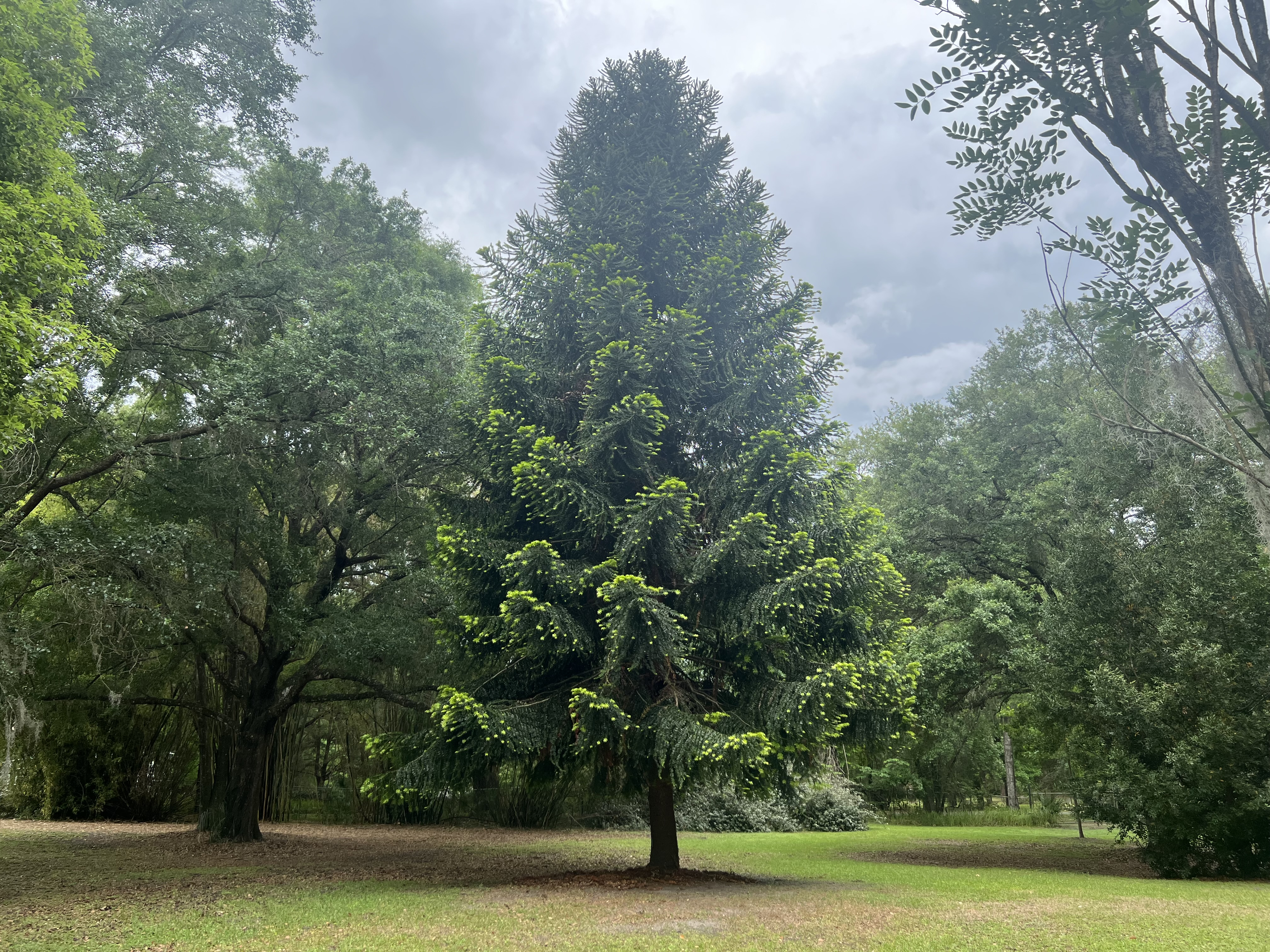
Conifer tree in the conifer garden.

== See also ==
- List of botanical gardens in the United States
