= Halley (given name) =

Halley is a unisex given name. Notable people with the name include:

== Female ==
- Halley Feiffer (born 1984), American actress
- Halley Gross (born 1985), American screenwriter
- Halley Brewster Savery Hough (1894–1967), American art curator
- Halley Wallace, Contest participant Miss Indiana Teen USA

== Male ==
- Halley Harding (1904–1967), American baseball player
- Halley G. Maddox (1899–1977), American career officer
- Halley H. Prosser (1870–1921), American politician
- Halley Stewart (1838–1937), English businessman

== See also ==
- Hayley, similar given name with other spellings
- Halley (surname)
- Halley (disambiguation)
