= Charles Hailey =

Experimental astrophysicist

- Education: Cornell University; Columbia University
- Known for: NuSTAR; General Antiparticle Spectrometer
- Awards: Lawrence Livermore National Laboratory Outstanding Achievement Award (three-time recipient)
- Scientific career
- Fields: Experimental physics Astrophysics
- Workplaces: Columbia University

Charles James "Chuck" Hailey is an experimental astrophysicist and Pupin Professor of Physics at Columbia University. He earned his BA in physics from Cornell University in 1977 and his PhD from Columbia in 1983, with a thesis entitled "The Development of an Imaging Gas Scintillation Proportional Counter for Use in X-ray Astronomy." He received tenure from Columbia University in 1995. Hailey's research focuses on high energy astrophysics and experimental particle physics. He is co-director of the Columbia Astrophysics Laboratory, where he works on gamma-ray and X-ray research.

Hailey led the team that built the NASA Nuclear Spectroscopic Telescope Array (NuSTAR) telescope. One of NuSTAR's main advantages, the use of slumping glass instead of polishing to achieve high resolution, was developed by Hailey himself. He continues to be very involved in the project, investigating emissions from the supermassive black hole at the center of the Milky Way as well as the sources of other X-ray and gamma emissions. Hailey is the chair of the NuSTAR Galactic Plane Survey working group.

Hailey is also Principal Investigator and leader of the General Antiparticle Spectrometer (GAPS) experiments, for which he works on developing new Si(Li) detectors for X-ray detection. One of the aims of the project is to attempt to detect dark matter and elucidate its composition by sending a balloon-suspended apparatus to search for anti-deuterons in the cosmic rays. The project had a successful prototype run in 2012 in Japan and is scheduled for a full run from Antarctica in 2019.

Hailey previously served as V/L-Division program leader for Space Science and Technology at the Lawrence Livermore National Laboratory, where he worked from 1986 to 1995. In addition, he held the post of associate program leader for Intelligence and National Security Technology in the Nonproliferation, Arms Control and International Security Directorate until joining the faculty at Columbia. At Livermore, Hailey received the prestigious Outstanding Achievement Award three times. Before that, he was employed as a research scientist in a now-defunct private firm building X-ray detectors.

He has made a variety of contributions to physics outside GAPS and NuSTAR. He has built or helped to build telescopes such as the three-meter telescope at the Lick Observatory and the High-Energy Focusing Telescope. He was a member of the UK Dark Matter Collaboration and collaborated with two other Columbia faculty members to build the liquid scintillator veto shield for the ZEPLIN-III dark matter detector. As part of a collaboration between researchers at Harvard and Columbia, Hailey worked on the EXIST All-Sky Sky Gamma-ray Survey mission study in 2000 at NASA's Goddard Space Flight Center. Hailey holds several patents for his work on NuSTAR and GAPS, among other projects, and has authored over 200 publications. He teaches an undergraduate quantum mechanics course at Columbia.

== Selected bibliography ==
- T. Aramaki et al., "Potential for Precision Measurement of Low-Energy Antiprotons with GAPS for Dark Matter and Primordial Black Hole Physics," Astroparticle Physics 59, 12, 2014.
- P. von Doetinchem et al., "The Flight of the GAPS Prototype Experiment," Astroparticle Physics, 54, 93, 2014.
- B.W.Grefenstette et al., "Asymmetries in Core-Collapse Supernovae from Maps of Radioactive 44Ti in Cassiopeia A," Nature, 506, 7488, 339, 2014.
- M. Nynka et al., "NuSTAR Study of Hard X-ray Morphology and Spectroscopy of PWN G21.5-0.9," Astrophysical Journal, 789, 72, 2014.
- S. Zhang et al., "High-Energy X-ray Detection of G359.89-0.08 (Sgr A-E): Magnetic Flux Tube Emission Powered by Cosmic-rays?" Astrophysical Journal, 784, 6, 2014
- C.J. Hailey, "An Indirect Search for Dark Matter Using Antideuterons: the GAPS Experiment," New Journal of Physics, vol. 11, 105022, 2009.
