= K. H. D. Haley =

British historian

Kenneth Harold Dobson Haley, FBA (19 April 1920 – 2 July 1997) was a British historian who specialised in seventeenth century British and Dutch history.

Haley was born in Southport, Lancashire (now Merseyside). He attended Huddersfield College before winning a scholarship to Balliol College, Oxford, where he gained a First in history. He taught at the University of Sheffield's history department from 1947 to 1982, spending the last 20 years as Professor of Modern History. In 1968 the Oxford University Press published his magnum opus, a biography of the leader of the first Whigs, Anthony Ashley Cooper, 1st Earl of Shaftesbury. He was awarded a Fellowship of the British Academy in 1987.

He was a Methodist and in 1948 he married Iris Houghton.

== Works ==
- William of Orange and the English Opposition 1672-1674 (1953).
- The First Earl of Shaftesbury (1968).
- The British and the Dutch: Political and Cultural Relations Through the Ages (1968).
- The Dutch in the Seventeenth Century (1972).
- An English Diplomat in the Low Countries: Sir William Temple and John De Witt 1655-1672 (1986).
