= Janet Halley =

American legal scholar

- Born: February 1952 (age 74)

Academic background
- Education: Princeton University (BA); University of California, Los Angeles (PhD); Yale University (JD)
- Influences: Eve Sedgwick, Friedrich Nietzsche, Michel Foucault, Sigmund Freud

Academic work
- Discipline: Family law, gender, sexuality
- Institutions: Harvard University; Stanford University; Hamilton College
- Notable works: Split Decisions: How and Why to Take a Break from Feminism
- Notable ideas: Governance feminism

Janet Elizabeth Halley (born February 1952) is an American legal scholar who is the Eli Goldston Professor of Law at Harvard Law School. Her work is influenced by critical legal studies, legal realism and postmodernism.

A self-described feminist, Halley is known for her critique of American feminism, dominance feminism, and left legalism, as well as her work on family law and the regulation of sexuality. She has also been a prominent voice in the public debate regarding sexual conduct codes on campuses in the United States in recent years, arguing against the broadening of the definition sexual assault and the adoption of the affirmative consent standard. She was the first expert on gender and sexuality in the legal system to receive a position at Harvard University.

== Education and legal career ==
Halley received a Bachelor's degree summa cum laude in English literature from Princeton University in 1974. In 1980 she earned a PhD in English literature from the University of California at Los Angeles, focusing on seventeenth century English poetry. Before pursuing legal education, she taught English for five years at Hamilton College as an assistant professor. Halley received her J.D. from Yale University in 1988, and then clerked for Judge Gilbert S. Merritt Jr. at the Court of Appeals for the Sixth Circuit. She worked two years as a litigator for the Boston office of the law firm Skadden, Arps, Slate, Meagher & Flom, before joining the Stanford Law School. She taught at Stanford from 1991 until 2000, and then joined the Harvard Law School. In 2006 she was appointed to the Royall chair in the institution.

== Research and academic activity ==
Halley has written on a wide variety of issues, but is widely known for her criticism of left legalism, radical dominance feminist thought and cultural feminism. She argues that left legal identitarian projects, such as feminist ones, have "bestowed sacred cow status" on certain reforms and deployed "identity-based claims in the form of rights, supposedly trumping all competing normative claims". Such legal projects, according to her, include, among others, affirmative action, sexual harassment and racial justice legal reforms.

Much of her critical writing is directed towards legal projects of dominance feminism and cultural feminism, branches of feminism which she says hold on to a self-perception of political powerlessness, despite gaining many achievements and influence in governance since the 1980s, especially in the legal realm. According to her, this self-perception prevents American feminism from examining social issues through other theories of sexual life and politics, such as queer theory and the knowledge-power theory of Michel Foucault, as well as making it difficult for feminists to acknowledge other just causes and harm to men. By focusing on legal projects and sanctions on issues such as rape, pornography and commercial sex, Halley claims radical feminism has adopted a sentimental and moralizing view of legal action, and created alliances with conservative and paternalistic male elites. She argues that seeking State-centered and legal solutions is a narrow point of view and many times an obstacle to finding pragmatic solutions to wide social problems such as sexual inequality, and that this approach often fosters weakness in the group it is trying to protect, enforcing traditional social norms of female fragility. In her book Split Decisions: How and Why to Take a Break from Feminism she calls to reexamine politics of sexuality by putting aside the feminist perspective, and to appreciate and learn from the splits and contradictions among different theories of sexuality.

In the past Halley stated that she identifies increasingly with and as a gay man and published an article on queer theory under the name Ian Halley. In Split Decisions she described herself as:

A sex-positive postmodernist, only rarely and intermittently feminist, a skeptic about identity politics, with a strong attraction to "queer" revelations of the strangeness and unknowability of social and sexual life, and a deep distrust of slave-moralistic pretensions to identity-political "powerlessness".

=== Governance feminism ===
The term "governance feminism" was first coined in Halley's book Split Decisions and later developed it in several articles, defining it as the new muscular feminist organizational style of the "quite noticeable installation of feminists and feminist ideas in actual legal-institutional power". Examples of such power according to her are the numerous sexual harassment programs in educational institutions and corporations in the United States and the development of feminist expertise that is used by special offices on gender equality and Non-governmental organizations. The name of the term was derived from the similarities Halley and colleagues identified between the powerful network-like non governmental organization establishments that feminists adopted, and the law produced by the school of new governance. (The latter is a movement in governance aimed at problem-solving through public participation in deliberations, which is intended to legitimize governing and make it more efficient).

Halley claims that governance feminism, led mainly by radical and cultural feminists, fails to acknowledge its will to power and the power it has acquired, and still views itself as the underdog through a theory of male domination and female subordination. She also points out a paradox in the fact that feminists work against male violence by envisioning solutions that are muscular and top-down in their power formation:

In Foucault's terms, they have not learned - they do not want to learn - how to cut off the head of the king. They seek to wield the sovereign's scepter and especially his sword. Criminal law is their preferred vehicle for reform and enforcement; and their idea of what to do with criminal law is not to manage populations, not to warn and deter, but to end impunity and abolish.

The term is to be further developed in the forthcoming book Governance Feminism: an Introduction, to be published by Minnesota University press, co-authored by Halley, Hila Shamir, Prabha Kotiswaran and Rachel Rebouche.

=== War rape and international law ===
One of the key feminist legal projects that are subject of Halley's writing is the criminalization of rape in international law. Governance feminism, according to her, had many achievements in this area, mainly in the international criminal tribunal for the former Yugoslavia, international criminal tribunal for Rwanda and Rome statute of the international criminal court, where a wide range of feminist legal rules were accepted. This has created what Halley names "the war rape antinomy": a dilemma among two separate feminist projects, one aimed at moving sex crimes higher up the hierarchy of the international courts' criminality, and the other at isolating sexual assault on women for separate prosecution. "To put it bluntly", Halley writes, "making rape visible contextualised sexual assaults in war — while framing sexual violence as an independent predicate crime reclassified rape as war. The former placed the rape of women in visible proximity to the death of men; the latter exceptionalised the rape of women, detached it from other aspects of the armed conflict in which it occurred, and focused prosecution, conviction and punishment on rape alone".

Through a close literary reading of the memoir A Woman in Berlin, Halley raises several legal questions regarding the criminalization of rape. The memoir describes the efforts of a German woman to survive the occupation of Berlin by the Red Army in 1945, and the widespread rapes committed by Soviet soldiers. Halley suggests that a special condemnation of rape, which emphasises sexual crimes in war over others, may weaponise rape and make it a tool of war or a casus belli. She also draws attention to the possibility that the idea that rape in war is a fate worse than death, which is advocated by some feminist circles, has downsides. These include a tendency to classify some armed conflicts in which war rapes occurred as "wars against women," despite the clear suffering they have inflicted on men too. She urges for suspicion towards such comparisons in legal advocacy.

=== Sexual conduct codes on campuses ===
Halley has voiced criticism on the shift of policies at several higher education institutions enforcing the anti-sex discrimination law, Title IX, and was one of the leaders of the opposition to a new sexual conduct code at Harvard in 2014. She claims that at some campuses the requirements for conviction of sexual assault were loosened, and that this was influenced by dominance feminist ideas coming from the Department of Education Office for Civil Rights and student movements. These changes, according to Halley, include allowing complaints on the basis of subjective unwantedness of the sexual conduct, and the disregard of the objective reasonableness requirement of the Supreme Court, which ruled that the conduct must be sufficiently severe or pervasive and to have a detrimental impact on the complainant in the eyes of the reasonable person. She also argues that the new requirements of affirmative consent in policies and procedures in some institutions, including Harvard, will foster a repressive and sex-negative moral order, and wrote that:

They will enable people who enthusiastically participated in sex to deny it later and punish their partners. They will function as protective legislation that encourages weakness among those they protect. They will install traditional social norms of male responsibility and female helplessness.

Halley was one of 28 Harvard Law School faculty members to sign a statement objecting to changes to the sexual harassment policy and procedures of the university in 2014. The statement claimed that the new policy and procedures "lack the most basic elements of fairness and due process" and "expanded the scope of forbidden conduct", so that it includes rules that are bluntly one-sided in favor of complainants. In a memo sent to her colleagues in Harvard, following the reform, Halley acknowledged a need to change the former "slipshod, dismissive and actively malign handling of sexual harassment claims", but warned that the new code threatens stigmatized minorities, lacks support for accused students and harms equal procedural treatment. In the following year after Halley and colleagues raised their concerns, the Harvard Law School announced it will implement its own policy and procedures on prevention of sexual harassment, which unlike the general policy of the university, provides a lawyer to accused students and includes a separate adjudicatory panel to determine guilt, whose members are not associated with Harvard.

Halley has visited several universities to share her ideas and views on changes to sexual conduct codes on campuses.

== Criticism ==
Several feminist legal scholars have criticized Halley's work, and particularly her call to "take a break from feminism". In her book Reshaping the Work-Family Debate, Joan Williams writes that this call is "not a play date that women subjected to domestic violence, rape, impoverishment upon divorce, sex discrimination at work, and other subjects at the center of feminism would care to attend". Williams argues that Halley's work is focused more on an assimilation-desire to resemble men, than on women's issues. She also hints that there is a connection between what she terms as Halley's "celebration of masculinity" and her position at Harvard, writing that "it is intriguing that Harvard has chosen a gender theorist who makes a name for herself by telling women not to make demands on men".

Michele Dauber from the Stanford Law School objects to Halley's claim that legal procedure is a potentially harmful tool which is used too frequently by feminists to regulate sexuality. In an interview with The New York Times Magazine she said that "The actual lived experience of real women is that they often are the victims of sexual violence. It's absurd to say that it undermines women's agency to give them a tool to stop that bad thing from happening. People are suffering from harm, you provide them with a remedy, and somehow that's infantilizing? No, it's empowering."

Robin West criticized Halley's work on left legalism and named it part of a neo-critical legal movement. West argues that unlike the traditional critical legal studies, which suggested utopian possibilities of less alienated forms of existence, neo-critics such as Halley write against attempts to advance such possibilities, targeting the "expanded civil rights world, with its focus on the injuries sustained by various minorities, cultures, sexually harassed working women, disabled adults, and badly educated and learning-disabled children". She claims that Halley and her colleagues refuse to acknowledge human suffering and its causes as a subject for left-legal theoretical scholarship, and that this brings the new critical movement closer to libertarian goals that it might want to admit.

== Publications ==
=== Books ===
- Split Decisions: How and Why to Take a Break from Feminism (Princeton University Press, 2006)
- Don't: A Reader's Guide to the Military's Anti-Gay Policy (Duke University Press, 1999)

=== Edited books and volumes ===
- Left Legalism/Left Critique (Duke University Press, 2002; co-editor Wendy Brown)
- After Sex? New Writing Since Queer Theory (Duke University Press, 2011; co-editor Andrew Parker)
- Critical Directions in Comparative Family Law, Vol. 58, no. 4 of the American Journal of Comparative Law (2010)
- Seeking the Woman in Late Medieval and Renaissance Literature: Essays in Feminist Contextual Criticism (University of Tennessee Press, 1989; co-editor Sheila Fisher)

=== Selected journal articles ===
- "What is Family Law?: A Genealogy Part II", Yale Journal of Law and the Humanities, Vol. 23: Iss. 2, Article 1 (2011)
- "What is Family Law?: A Genealogy Part I", Yale Journal of Law and the Humanities, Vol. 23: Iss. 1, Article 1 (2011)
- "Rape in Berlin: Reconsidering the Criminalisation of Rape in the International Law of Armed Conflict", 9 Melbourne Journal of International Law, Vol. 78 (2008)
