= Hailey, Missouri =

Extinct town in the American state of Missouri

Coordinates: 36°42′39″N 93°42′27″W

Hailey is an extinct town in Barry County, in the U.S. state of Missouri. The GNIS classifies it as a populated place.

A post office called Hailey was established in 1881, and remained in operation until 1936. N. L. Hailey, an early postmaster, gave the community his last name.
