= Harry Hayley =

English rugby union footballer and cricketer

Harry Hayley (22 February 1860 – 3 June 1922) was an English rugby union footballer for Yorkshire, St. John's Training College, York (1880–81), and Wakefield Trinity, and first-class cricketer, who played seven matches for Yorkshire County Cricket Club over a fourteen-year period between 1884 and 1898.

Born in Heath, Wakefield, Yorkshire, England, Hayley played rugby union for Yorkshire against Middlesex at The Oval on 25 February 1878, and played cricket for Yorkshire as a right-handed batsman, who scored 122 runs at 11.09 with a best of 24. He conceded 48 runs with his right arm medium bowling without taking a wicket. He also took three catches.

He died in June 1922 in St. John's, Wakefield, Yorkshire.

== Change of Code ==
When Wakefield Trinity converted from the rugby union code to the rugby league code on Tuesday 27 August 1895, Harry Hayley would have been 35 years of age. Subsequently, he didn't become both a rugby union and rugby league footballer for Wakefield Trinity.

== Outside of rugby league ==
Harry Hayley sold Football Goods at the Yorkshire County Athletic Warehouse (established 1882), Corn Exchange, Upper Westgate, Wakefield circa-1920, the shop later relocated to 23 The Springs, Wakefield.

== Genealogical information ==
Harry Hayley was the younger brother of Arthur Hayley.
