= Dan Haley =

American football player and coach (1940–2013)

Biographical details
- Born: September 15, 1940; Pineville, Kentucky, U.S.
- Died: October 19, 2013 (aged 73); Bowling Green, Kentucky, U.S.

Playing career
- 1958–1961: Kentucky

Coaching career (HC unless noted)
- 1973–1980: Peducah Tilghman HS (KY)
- 1984–1995: Bowling Green HS (KY)
- 1996–2000: Cumberland (KY)
- 2001–2002: Western Kentucky (TE)

Head coaching record
- Overall: 15–34 (college)

Accomplishments and honors

Championships
- 1 MSC (1997)

Dan Johnson Haley (September 15, 1940 – October 19, 2013) was an American football player and coach. Haley played college football at the University of Kentucky under coach Blanton Collier. He served as the head football coach at Cumberland College—now known as the University of the Cumberlands—in Williamsburg, Kentucky from 1996 to 2000. He later served as an assistant at Western Kentucky University under Jack Harbaugh.

== Head coaching record ==
=== College ===
Year	Team	Overall	Conference	Standing	Bowl/playoffs
Cumberland Indians (Mid-South Conference) (1996–2000)
1996	Cumberland	2–7	1–6	T–7th	
1997	Cumberland	5–4	5–1	T–1st	
1998	Cumberland	3–7	1–6	7th	
1999	Cumberland	3–8	2–5	T–5th	
2000	Cumberland	2–8	1–6	7th	
Cumberland:		15–34	10–24		
Total:		15–34			
National championship Conference title Conference division title or championship game berth
