= Barbara Bryne =

British-American actress (1929–2023)

- Born: Barbara Isabel Birkinshaw; 1 April 1929; London, England
- Died: 2 May 2023 (aged 94); Minneapolis, Minnesota, U.S.
- Occupation: Actress
- Years active: 1947–2012
- Television: The Neverending Story; American Playhouse; Love, Sidney
- Spouse: Dennis Spence (m. 1953; died 2018)
- Children: 1

Barbara Bryne (née Barbara Isabel Birkinshaw; 1 April 1929 – 2 May 2023) was a British-American actress of film, theatre, and television. On stage she appeared in comedy, dramatic, and musical productions of Broadway.

== Early life and education ==
Barbara Bryne was born Barbara Isabel Birkinshaw on 1 April 1929 in London, England.

She studied studied at the Royal Academy of Dramatic Art.

== Career ==
Bryne moved to Canada in the early 1960s. She was a frequent performer at the Stratford Shakespeare Festival (Stratford, Ontario) from 1966, and at the Guthrie Theater (Minneapolis, Minnesota) for around 50 years.

Bryne appeared in the original Broadway productions of Stephen Sondheim's Sunday in the Park with George (as George's mother) and Into The Woods (as Jack's mother). She also performed in Sondheim's A Little Night Music in Washington, D.C. She was also a frequent performer at Minneapolis' Guthrie Theater. Among the plays in which she appeared there were Mother Courage, The Glass Menagerie, She Stoops to Conquer, Design for Living, and Pygmalion.

On television, she played "Mrs. Gaffney" on the Tony Randall series, Love, Sidney (1981–1983). In 2011 she appeared as Queen Victoria in H.M.S. Pinafore, which was filmed for PBS in late August 2011. Among the films in which she has appeared are: Romeo & Juliet (1993 TV film), Into the Woods (1991 TV film), Two Evil Eyes (1990; "The Black Cat" segment), Sunday in the Park with George (1986 TV film), Amadeus (1984), The Bostonians (1984), and The School for Scandal (1975 TV film).

== Accolades ==
In 1982, she was nominated for a Drama Desk Award as Outstanding Actress in a Drama for her role as "Kath" in the first American production of Joe Orton's Entertaining Mr. Sloane (which starred Maxwell Caulfield in the title role).

== Personal life and death ==
Bryne married Dennis Spence in 1953. They remained married for 55 years until his death in 2018. Bryne died on 2 May 2023 in Minneapolis, at the age of 94.

== Stage ==
Year	Title	Role(s)	Notes
1966	Henry VI	Margery Jourdan	
1966	Twelfth Night	Maria	
1966	King Lear	Goneril	
1967	Richard III	Duchess of York	
1967	The Government Inspector	Locksmith's Wife, Korobkin's Wife	
1967	The Merry Wives of Windsor	Ensemble	
1968	Tartuffe	Mme. Pernelle	
1968	The Three Musketeers	Mme. Coquenard, Landlady of the Gilded Lily	
1968	A Midsummer Night's Dream	Puck	
1981	Cymbeline	The Queen	
1981	Entertaining Mr Sloane	Kath	Nomination: Drama Desk Award
1984–1985	Sunday in the Park with George	Blair Daniels, Old Lady	Broadway debut
1985	Hay Fever	Clara	
1986–1989	Into the Woods	Jack's Mother	
1989	The Importance of Being Earnest	Lady Augusta Bracknell	
1992	Romeo and Juliet	Nurse	
1993	A Midsummer Night's Dream	Robin Starveling	
1994	Sunday in the Park with George	Blair Daniels, Old Lady	10th Anniversary Concert
1995	The Merry Wives of Windsor	Mistress Quickly	
1997	Into the Woods	Jack’s Mother	10th Anniversary Concert
2002	A Little Night Music	Madame Armfeldt	
2002	The Chairs	Old Woman	
2003	Three Sisters	Anfisa	
2006	The Birthday Party	Mistress Quickly	
2007	Our Leading Lady	Maude Bentley	
2007	Jane Eyre	Mrs. Fairfax	
2009	When We Are Married	Mrs. Northrop	
2010	Macbeth	Weïrd Sister	
2011	H.M.S. Pinafore	Queen Victoria	
2012	Hay Fever	Clara	
2012	Embers	Nini	

== Filmography ==
Year	Title	Role	Notes
1963	Festival	Gladys	(segment "I Spy")
1967	Mister Rogers	Miss Paulifficate	
1974	The Play's the Thing	Betty	(episode "Back to Beulah")
1975	Great Performances	Mrs. Candour	(episode "The School for Scandal")
1981	CBS Children's Mystery Theatre	Blanche Guizot	(episode "Mystery at Fire Island")
1982	Best of the West	Miss Hanratty	(episode "The Calico Kid Goes to School")
1982	Maid in America	Aunt Melissa	TV movie
1983	Svengali	Mrs. Burns-Rizzo	TV movie
1982–1983	Love, Sidney	Mrs. Gaffney	
1984	The Bostonians	Mrs. Tarrant	
1984	Amadeus	Frau Weber	
1990	Two Evil Eyes	Martha	(segment "The Black Cat")
1986–1991	American Playhouse	Jack's Mother / Old Lady / Blair Daniels	
1993	Romeo and Juliet	Nurse	TV movie
1995–1996	The Neverending Story	Urgl	Voice
