= List of Herman's Head episodes =

This is a list of episodes for the television series Herman's Head.

== Series overview ==
Season	Episodes	Originally released	
Season	Episodes	First released	Last released
1	25	September 8, 1991	May 10, 1992
2	25	September 13, 1992	May 9, 1993
3	22	September 16, 1993	April 21, 1994

=== Broadcast history ===
Season	Time
1991–92	Sunday at 9:30 pm
1992–93	Sunday at 9:30 pm
1993–94	Thursday at 9:30 pm

== Episodes ==
=== Season 1 (1991–92) ===
No. overall	No. in season	Title	Directed by	Written by	Original release date	Viewers (millions)
1	1	"Pilot"	Andy Cadiff	Andy Guerdat, Steve Kreinberg	September 8, 1991	18.2
Herman has to decide whether to take advantage of Connie's break-up with Jay to express his own feelings, or provide her with a shoulder to cry on.
2	2	"Lies, Lies, Lies"	J.D. Lobue	Roberto Benabib, Karl Fink	September 15, 1991	14.1
Herman becomes enmeshed in a web of lies of his own making when Meredith, a former classmate-turned-woman reporter, shows up to do a "Where are they now?" story on Herman's less-than-stellar life.
3	3	"Days of Wine and Herman"	J.D. Lobue	David Landsberg	September 22, 1991	17.0
During a party for Mr. Bracken, Herman drinks a bit too much and gets in over his head when he has to give a speech praising his boss.
4	4	"Isn't It Romantic?"	J.D. Lobue	Michael B. Kaplan	September 29, 1991	14.5
When Louise's newest relationship goes sour, Herman ends up comforting her and Louise gets the wrong idea; Herman has to figure out a way to let her down gently.
5	5	"Fatal Distraction"	J.D. Lobue	Cheryl Holliday	October 13, 1991	13.1
In this play on the movie Fatal Attraction, Herman has a one-night stand with a woman, Yvonne (Megan Mullally), who turns out to be more than a little obsessive...
6	6	"The Herminator"	J.D. Lobue	David Babcock	October 20, 1991	12.0
Herman, who has been tired of being considered "sweet", seeks to be more red-blooded. When an executive vice president of the company is sexually harassing Heddy, Herman punches him out.
7	7	"My Brother, Myself"	J.D. Lobue	Diane Wilk	October 27, 1991	12.5
Herman is left in charge of the office after Bracken informs him that he is having a heart attack. Meanwhile, Herman's brother Stan visits with his fiancee, Jaclyn. Herman and Stan's already fraught relationship gets complicated when Jaclyn starts hitting on Herman. NOTE: Jason Bernard eventually succumbed to a real-life heart attack four years later in 1996.
8	8	"9½ Hours"	J.D. Lobue	Roberto Benabib, Karl Fink	November 3, 1991	12.6
While working late to finish a project, Herman eavesdrops on Heddy and her date. After finding out he is married, Heddy turns to Herman for solace. They eventually wind up sleeping together in Bracken's office, but don't know how to handle the affair the next morning.
9	9	"Babbling Brooks"	J.D. Lobue	Michael B. Kaplan	November 10, 1991	13.7
Herman accidentally spills some secrets that his co-workers told him to the others, getting him into trouble with everyone.
10	10	"Near-Death Wish"	J.D. Lobue	Cheryl Holliday	November 17, 1991	9.7
A coworker of Herman's is killed in an elevator accident that nearly killed Herman as well. Because Herman was the last man he had spoken with, the coworker's spirit reappears inside Herman's head and convinces the quartet not to be forgotten as he was. Herman seeks to break a new world record for most work done in one sitting, which starts impacting not only his office performance, but encouraging Louise to try something. It is incumbent on Mr. Bracken to teach Herman about the meaning of remembrance and living life.
11	11	"Bracken's Daughter"	J.D. Lobue	David Landsberg	November 24, 1991	16.0
Mr. Bracken wants Herman to escort his daughter Susan around, but takes a dim view of things when the two become romantically involved.
12	12	"The Last Boy Scout"	J.D. Lobue	Graham Yost	December 1, 1991	14.4
After buying a stolen computer, Herman is stricken with guilt and goes to absurd lengths to try and return it.
13	13	"Fear and Loathing in Manhattan"	J.D. Lobue	Roberto Benabib, Karl Fink	December 22, 1991	11.8
Herman meets famous Pulitzer-winning writer, Russell Boswell, who Herman admires because of his no-holds-barred pursuit of the corrupt. But when Herman becomes involved in Boswell's own not-so-ethical investigation of a Senator, he has second thoughts.
14	14	"That's What Friends Aren't For"	J.D. Lobue	David Babcock	January 5, 1992	16.0
Herman and Jay decide to become roommates.
15	15	"To Err Is Herman"	J.D. Lobue	Michael B. Kaplan	January 12, 1992	14.4
Mr. Bracken is being considered for a promotion, and Herman is asked to evaluate Bracken's performance in his current position. Inside Herman's head, Genius suggests that there is always room for improvement, and that performance reports ought not to be too negative or too positive, so Herman writes that Bracken can be gruff on the job. When Herman learns that even such small remark could be censure to doom Bracken's career, he goes to great lengths to stop Mr. Waterton from reviewing it.
16	16	"How to Succeed in Business Without Really Dying"	J.D. Lobue	Bill Freiberger, Adam Markowitz	January 19, 1992	15.5
Herman goes skydiving with Mr. Crawford and Jay and writes an article about his experience skydiving.
17	17	"Hard Times"	J.D. Lobue	David Landsberg, Rich Singer, Barry Stringfellow	February 9, 1992	12.0
Herman begins dating attractive model Jennifer, but soon begins to question his good fortune.
18	18	"A Kept Herman"	J.D. Lobue	David Babcock	February 16, 1992	14.9
Victoria, a powerful female executive at Waterton, wants Herman to become her assistant editor. It soon transpires that Victoria wants Herman for more than that, however.
19	19	"Herman au Naturel"	J.D. Lobue	Don Demaio, D. B. Gilles	February 23, 1992	18.1
Crawford insists on the research department going to the Bahamas for a self-awareness seminar... which everyone discovers is an all-nude seminar.
20	20	"Sweet Obsessions"	J.D. Lobue	David Landsberg	March 8, 1992	15.6
Herman and the others decide to help Mr. Bracken quit smoking by all resolving to give up one bad habit of their own in a show of team support. Unfortunately, the result is that everyone is going crazy, just in time for a corporate consultant's review of team performance and downsizing.
21	21	"First Time for Everything"	J.D. Lobue	Michael B. Kaplan	March 22, 1992	17.6
Louise decides it's time to lose her virginity, and starts checking out her prospects. When there are plenty of men willing to sleep with her, but not treat her as a woman and a human being, Herman tries to convince Louise virginity can be of great value.
22	22	"Bracken Up Is Hard to Do"	J.D. Lobue	Michael B. Kaplan	April 5, 1992	17.4
When Mr. Bracken and his wife break up, Herman sympathetically invites him to stay at his apartment - hilarity ensues as the two become the "Odd Couple" of sorts, and Herman and Louise set out to reunite Bracken and his wife.
23	23	"Guns and Neurosis"	J.D. Lobue	Bill Freiberger, Adam Markowitz	April 19, 1992	15.4
When Herman's apartment is robbed, Crawford convinces him to buy a gun for self-defense, but he winds up accidentally shooting Crawford in the chest.
24	24	"Dirty Rotten Scoundrels"	J.D. Lobue	Roberto Benabib, Karl Fink	May 3, 1992	13.0
Herman and Jay go undercover to get a story on a princess, but Herman soon falls in love with her.
25	25	"Twisted Sister"	J.D. Lobue	Bill Freiberger, Adam Markowitz	May 10, 1992	12.1
Another one of the Brooks brood come visiting when Herman's little sister Suzie (Jennifer Aniston) arrives in New York. Already over-protective of Suzie, Herman's anxieties get even worse when she and Jay sleep together.

=== Season 2 (1992–93) ===
No. overall	No. in season	Title	Directed by	Written by	Original release date	Viewers (millions)
26	1	"Stop Me Before I Help Again"	J.D. Lobue	David Babcock	September 13, 1992	16.6
Herman is sued by a woman he gave CPR to when he accidentally cracked her ribs, while Jay learns to deal with his sexual addiction.
27	2	"Sperm 'n' Herman"	J.D. Lobue	Bill Freiberger, Adam Markowitz	September 20, 1992	15.3
Herman's former girlfriend Rebecca wants to renew their relationship... for the purposes of getting him to help in artificially conceiving a child.
28	3	"Herman's Heddy"	J.D. Lobue	Roberto Benabib, Karl Fink	September 27, 1992	14.2
Herman tries to halt Heddy's wedding because he realizes that she does not love her fiance, and he realizes that his feelings for her continue; if he does not act right away, he may never have another opportunity.
29	4	"Intern-al Affairs"	J.D. Lobue	Michael B. Kaplan	October 4, 1992	14.4
No good deed goes unpunished for Herman once more when he hires Louise's friend as an office intern, and she turns around and sues him for sexual harassment.
30	5	"Brackenhooker"	J.D. Lobue	Michael B. Kaplan	October 18, 1992	12.8
When even Herman can't find a date for a desperate Mr. Bracken, he turns to Jay for help, with dubious results.
31	6	"The Watertongate Break-In"	J.D. Lobue	Bill Freiberger, Adam Markowitz	October 25, 1992	13.3
Waterton's sudden death creates a scramble for power, and to save everyone's job, Herman decides to join forces with Crawford — who then involves Herman in a secret campaign to eliminate the competition for control of the company.
32	7	"Untitled Girlfriend Project"	J.D. Lobue	Roberto Benabib, Karl Fink	November 1, 1992	10.3
Herman becomes involved with Elizabeth (played by Julia Campbell), a rather opinionated woman who immediately clashes with Jay over his misogynist views.
33	8	"The 'C' Word"	J.D. Lobue	Michael B. Kaplan	November 3, 1992	11.4
When Herman's one-time girlfriend (and Bracken's daughter) Susan returns to town and wants to start up their relationship again, Herman has to choose between her and his new girlfriend Elizabeth.
34	9	"Friends and Lovers"	J.D. Lobue	Kent Black	November 8, 1992	13.4
Elizabeth becomes suspicious when she finds out Herman is working undercover as a dating show contestant, believing he might be tempted by other women.
35	10	"Subterranean Homesick Blues"	J.D. Lobue	Roberto Benabib, Karl Fink	November 15, 1992	10.2
Herman and Elizabeth decide to move in together, which prompts no end of arguments over shared space, priorities, etc. Finally they decide to break up.
36	11	"The One Where They Go on the Love Boat"	J.D. Lobue	Bill Freiberger, Adam Markowitz	November 22, 1992	15.2
The office workers go on a trip to the Bahamas — Herman has to deal with Elizabeth, who happens to be on board, while Louise gets to indulge her long-time infatuation for Davy Jones of The Monkees.
37	12	"Feardom of Speech"	J.D. Lobue	Paul A. Kaplan	December 13, 1992	11.4
Herman must overcome his fear of public speaking, when he is forced to give a speech on the topic of Research in the 90's, at a company meeting.
38	13	"A Charlie Brown Fitzer"	J.D. Lobue	Michael B. Kaplan	December 20, 1992	14.4
Herman and Heddy spend Christmas with Louise's family — a family for who she is not particularly proud of their embarrassing ways.
39	14	"All's Affair in Love"	J.D. Lobue	David Landsberg	January 3, 1993	11.0
Herman messes things up yet again and sets Louise up with John, who turns out to be a married man... but Louise doesn't figure it out until she is deeply in love with him.
40	15	"Open All Night"	J.D. Lobue	David Landsberg	January 17, 1993	14.5
To save Crawford's butt, the gang has to pull an all-nighter to get him out of a jam. Herman and Heddy, Bracken and Crawford, and Louise and Jay end up pairing up and each learn something new about the other on an intimate personal level as they struggle to meet the deadline.
41	16	"Gals-a-Poppin'"	J.D. Lobue	David Babcock	January 24, 1993	14.4
When Louise and Heddy strike back at their obnoxious new boss, Herman gets caught in the middle. Dawn Wells guest stars as Mary Ann Summers.
42	17	"Anatomy of a Blind Date"	J.D. Lobue	Michael B. Kaplan	February 7, 1993	14.6
Still recovering from his break-up with Elizabeth, Herman gets set up on a blind date, while the rest of the gang play poker.
43	18	"My Funny Valentine"	J.D. Lobue	Michael B. Kaplan	February 14, 1993	11.1
When Herman hosts a Valentine Day's party, everyone gets lucky... except him.
44	19	"God, Girls and Herman"	J.D. Lobue	Andy Guerdat, Steve Kreinberg	February 28, 1993	14.8
Herman ends up sleeping with the aptly-named Eve, and his "Head" personalities get a visit from God, or Herman's image of him... as Leslie Nielsen. God has paid the quartet a visit on account of Herman's Uncle Wally about to undergo major surgery, although He is not happy about what is transgressing with Eve. Leslie Nielsen guest stars as God.
45	20	"Layla: The Unplugged Version"	J.D. Lobue	Roberto Benabib, Karl Fink	March 14, 1993	12.8
Jay gets a visit from his ex-fiance, who stole his heart, and left him standing at the altar seven years earlier. After talking and spending some time with her, Jay's old feelings for her are rekindled, but the question is: will she break his heart again? When Herman wonders exactly that, he and Jay's friendship is in danger.
46	21	"The Cat's in the Cradle"	J.D. Lobue	Bill Freiberger, Adam Markowitz	March 28, 1993	12.8
Herman gets a visit from another family member when his newly-retired father visits looking for some company and the chance to rebond with his son. When Herman is able to be with his father, Dad decides to come to Herman...by getting a token job at Waterton Publishing.
47	22	"Fired in a Crowded Research Room"	J.D. Lobue	Tim Maile, Douglas Tuber	April 11, 1993	13.5
Herman manages to get Heddy fired for screwing up a report assignment, and then has to go the distance to get her job back.
48	23	"I Wanna Go Home"	J.D. Lobue	David Landsberg	April 25, 1993	13.6
It's time for a near-end-of-scene flashback episode to save money, as Herman recalls his adventures in New York while deciding whether to stay where he is or go back to his hometown in Ohio to accept a new job.
49	24	"Love Me Two Timer"	J.D. Lobue	Andy Glickman, Keith Hossman	May 2, 1993	12.3
Herman gets invited to an after concert party in the hotel suite of rock star Lita Ford, but winds up cheating on the girl he is dating with the rock star. Lita Ford guest stars.
50	25	"Love and the Single Parent"	J.D. Lobue	Bill Freiberger, Adam Markowitz	May 9, 1993	12.1
When Herman starts dating new girlfriend Carin, he initially runs up against tough resistance from her son Brad. Ironically, Herman manages to win Brad over and the two become best buddies... much to Carin's dismay.

=== Season 3 (1993–94) ===
No. overall	No. in season	Title	Directed by	Written by	Original release date	Viewers (millions)
51	1	"Herma-phrodite"	Greg Antonacci	David Babcock	September 16, 1993	10.2
To get a story, Herman goes undercover as a woman and discovers a few things about Heddy and what she goes through. Patrick Ewing guest stars.
52	2	"There's a Fly Girl in My Soup"	Greg Antonacci	Joel Madison	September 23, 1993	11.2
Herman encourages Bracken's niece Rene to become a Fly Girl (i.e., a dancer on "In Living Color"); Mr. Bracken isn't particularly happy about Rene's career choice or Herman's involvement. The Fly Girls (Laurie Ann Gibson, Jossie Harris, Deidre Lang, Lisa Thompson and Masako Willis) guest star.
53	3	"When Hermy Met Crawford's Daughter"	Greg Antonacci	Greg Antonacci, Adam Markowitz	September 30, 1993	9.7
Herman wants to break up with his new girlfriend Ellen, who convinces him to meet her father; things take a turn for the worse when he discovers her father is none other than his boss at Waterton, Mr. Crawford.
54	4	"When Hairy Met Hermy"	Greg Antonacci	Bill Freiberger, Adam Markowitz	October 7, 1993	9.7
In his eternal quest for the perfect girlfriend, Herman dates Heather, but it turns out she's a tad too hairy for his tastes. Meanwhile, Jay and Louise begin to wonder if they're attracted to each other. Morey Amsterdam and Rose Marie guest star.
55	5	"Over Herman's Head"	Greg Antonacci	Tim Maile, Douglas Tuber	October 14, 1993	9.1
Herman's neighbor in the upstairs apartment drops dead after the two of them had a shouting match. Compounding Herman's problems, Heddy decides to take the apartment after her current boyfriend kicks her out of the apartment he's paying for.
56	6	"Jaybo and Weesie: A Love Story"	Greg Antonacci	Michael B. Kaplan	October 21, 1993	9.4
When Jay decides to turn a new leaf and give up his old womanizing ways, Herman tries to get Louise to go on a date with him, but Jay just can not help himself and reverts to type.
57	7	"Hermo-tivated"	Greg Antonacci	Adam Markowitz	October 26, 1993	5.6
Motivational speaker Dick Van Adams inspires Herman... to become a success while stepping on his friends.
58	8	"Jay Is for Jealous"	Greg Antonacci	Tim Maile, Douglas Tuber	November 4, 1993	9.0
Herman's sister Suzie (Jennifer Aniston) comes back to town and manages to aggravate both Herman (she plans to become a writer) and Louise (since she previously dated Jay). Appropriately, the "brain" characters get a new and annoying addition when Jealousy joins their group. Bobcat Goldthwait guest stars as Jealousy.
59	9	"Trouble in Paradise"	Greg Antonacci	Tim Maile, Douglas Tuber	November 11, 1993	7.8
While taking a vacation Herman becomes involved with Aurora, a beautiful model. Nothing ever works out for him as usual, though, when Jay and Louise show up with their own rocky relationship and both looking to friend Herman for help and support.
60	10	"When Hermy Met Maureen McCormick"	Greg Antonacci	Bill Freiberger	November 18, 1993	10.4
Herman gets to work with Maureen McCormick as she writes a book on contraception, getting to fulfill his long-time crush on the actress. Unfortunately, he and Jay almost come to blows when a jealous Jay confesses to a similar crush. Maureen McCormick guest stars.
61	11	"An Actor Prepares"	Greg Antonacci	Michael B. Kaplan	December 2, 1993	9.4
A movie star, who's playing the role of an adventuresome fact-checker in his next film, researches his part by tagging along with Herman.
62	12	"A Decent Proposal"	Greg Antonacci	Mark Ganzel	December 16, 1993	8.4
When Heddy's old rival Heather arrives in town, Heddy asks Herman to pose as her husband to impress the woman. Meanwhile, Mr. Bracken works on his musical, "Deuteronomy."
63	13	"When Hermy Met Crawford's Girlfriend"	Greg Antonacci	Bill Freiberger, Adam Markowitz	December 30, 1993	9.9
Crawford's girlfriend Stephanie dumps him and goes after..Herman, who finds himself in a bind.
64	14	"Three on a Match"	Greg Antonacci	David Babcock	January 13, 1994	8.3
After getting refused for an important writing job, Herman goes up to the roof and ends up trapped with a suicidal nutjob, Bob (Gilbert Gottfried), when a fire breaks out.
65	15	"You Say Tomato"	Gary Halvorson	Tim Maile, Douglas Tuber	February 3, 1994	8.3
Herman's new girlfriend Lauren is everything he could want, personality-wise, but as always Herman isn't happy as he obsesses over playmate Miss February.
66	16	"Once More With Feeling"	Greg Antonacci	Tim Doyle, Mark Drop	February 10, 1994	9.5
Herman and Heddy decided to give into their feelings and start dating, but a series of interruptions keep them from consummating their relationship.
67	17	"The Herm from Ipanema"	Gail Mancuso	Jack Amiel, Michael Begler	February 17, 1994	9.2
Herman decides to give it all up during a tropical vacation and buy a local bar on the island. Bob Denver guest stars as himself.
68	18	"Bedtime for Hermo"	Greg Antonacci	Michael B. Kaplan	March 10, 1994	9.2
The "head" characters go into overdrive when Herman tries to get a good night's sleep the night before a high-pressure meeting.
69	19	"Herm in the Time of Cholera"	Greg Antonacci	Tim Maile, Douglas Tuber	March 24, 1994	8.6
Herman finds himself attracted to Lil the copier repair girl, but she doesn't return his feelings.
70	20	"Absence Makes the Head Grow Fonder"	Greg Antonacci	Alec Berg, Jeff Schaffer	April 7, 1994	8.2
Herman breaks up with his newest girlfriend Sarah, sees her a little later and tries reuniting with her.
71	21	"A Head in the Polls"	Greg Antonacci	Andy Glickman, Keith Hossman	April 14, 1994	7.3
Herman becomes involved with Sandra Clayton (Michelle Phillips), who is running for the Senate, but when the tabloids get hold of their relationship Sandra has second thoughts.
72	22	"First Impressions"	Greg Antonacci	Mark Ganzel	April 21, 1994	8.5
Herman is hit by a taxi in an accident and as he lies in a coma his staff friends each remember Herman as they first met him, with each brain character filling in for the emotion the friend first saw Herman acting out.
