= Kaleena Kiff =

American actress, producer, and director

- Born: October 23, 1974 (age 51); Santa Monica, California, U.S.
- Occupations: Actress, producer, director
- Years active: 1980–present

Kaleena Kiff is an American actress, producer, and director. Kiff is known for her roles in the sitcoms Love, Sidney and The New Leave It to Beaver.

== Career ==
Kiff began her acting career in 1980. In 1982, she appeared in the NBC comedy Love, Sidney as Patricia (“Patti”) Morgan opposite Tony Randall and Swoosie Kurtz. In 1984, she landed the role of Kelly Cleaver, daughter of Wally (Tony Dow) and Mary Ellen Cleaver (Janice Kent) in the 1985 revival series The New Leave It to Beaver. After the series ended in 1989, Kiff acted sporadically in mainly bit roles.

In 2008, she produced the musical short E vuoto per amore (He Is Empty for Love), directed by Galen Fletcher, screened at the Red Rock Film Festival. Also in 2008, she directed a short film titled Alice & Huck, starring Allison Mack. The short won three accolades at The Big Easy Shorts Festival: Best Director (for herself), Best Editing, and Best Drama.

She co-created and directed the first five episodes of the online science-fiction/fantasy webseries Riese: Kingdom Falling, which aired in 2009.

In 2014, Kiff produced the comedy thriller film The Legend of Barney Thomson (originally titled The Long Midnight of Barney Thomson).

== Filmography ==
Film
Year	Film	Role	Notes
1987	Jaws: The Revenge	Additional Voices	
1988	Oliver & Company	Additional Voices	
1990	Ghost Dad	Additional Voices	
2005	When Jesse Was Born	–	Executive producer
2007	Locked Out	–	Producer
2008	Alice & Huck	–	Short film; director, producer
2008	He Is Empty for Love	–	Producer
2014	Death Do Us Part	–	Producer
2015	The Legend of Barney Thomson	–	Producer
Television
Year	Title	Role	Notes
1980	The Jeffersons	Liza	1 episode
1981	Sidney Shorr: A Girl's Best Friend	Patricia “Patti” Morgan	Television movie
1981–83	Love, Sidney	Patricia “Patti” Morgan	44 episodes
1983	Still the Beaver	Kelly Cleaver	Television movie
1983	Memorial Day	Kara	Television movie
1983	An Uncommon Love	Lindsay	Television movie
1983	Family Ties	Young Mallory	1 episode
1984	Three's Company	Muffit	1 episode
1984	Pole Position	Daisy (Voice)	13 episodes
1985	Down to Earth	Roxanne	1 episode
1984–89	The New Leave It to Beaver	Kelly Cleaver	100 episodes
1986	Headin' Home for the Holidays	Jenny	Television movie Credited as Helena Kiff
1987	Popeye and Son	Dee Dee (Voice)	13 episodes
1991	Never Forget	Student	Television movie
2005	Smallville	Warehouse Worker	1 episode
2008	Supernatural	Female victim	1 episode
2009	Riese: Kingdom Falling	–	Co-creator, director, producer, writer

== Awards and nominations ==
Year	Award	Result	Category	Series
1983	Young Artist Award	Nominated	Best Young Actress in a Comedy Series	Love, Sidney
1988	Young Artist Award	Won	Best Young Actress in a Cable Series or Special	The New Leave It to Beaver
1989	Young Artist Award	Won	Best Young Actress in a Cable Series or Special	The New Leave It to Beaver
