= Love, Sidney =

- Title card showing Sidney Shorr and Patti Morgan together
- Genre: Sitcom
- Based on: "Sidney Shorr: A Girl's Best Friend" by Marilyn Cantor Baker
- Developed by: Oliver Hailey
- Starring: Tony Randall; Swoosie Kurtz; Kaleena Kiff; Alan North; Chip Zien; Barbara Bryne; Lynne Thigpen
- Opening theme: "Friends Forever" performed by Tony Randall, Swoosie Kurtz & Kaleena Kiff (Opening version, eps. 1–20, 30-44; Closing version, eps. 1–20); also by Gladys & Bubba Knight (Opening version, eps. 21–29; closing version, eps. 21–44)
- Country of origin: United States
- Original language: English
- No. of seasons: 2
- No. of episodes: 44

Production
- Executive producers: George Eckstein (1981–1982); Rod Parker & Hal Cooper (1982–1983)
- Running time: 30 minutes
- Production companies: R.G. Productions; Warner Bros. Television

Original release
- Network: NBC
- Release: October 28, 1981 – June 6, 1983

Love, Sidney is an American sitcom television series which aired two seasons on NBC, from October 28, 1981, to June 6, 1983. It stars Tony Randall as Sidney Shorr (a single, closeted gay man), Swoosie Kurtz as Laurie Morgan (a single mother with whom he shares his home), and Kaleena Kiff as Patricia "Patti" Morgan (Laurie's young daughter). It was the first program on American television to feature a gay person as the central character, although his sexual orientation was carefully downplayed for most of the series' duration.

The series was based on a short story by Marilyn Cantor Baker, which was adapted as the TV movie Sidney Shorr: A Girl's Best Friend, which NBC aired a few weeks before the series premiered. It was produced by Warner Bros. Television.

== Synopsis ==
The storyline begins with the television movie Sidney Shorr: A Girl's Best Friend. Randall plays the title character, a well-to-do gay New Yorker in his 50s, who befriends a single woman, Laurie Morgan (originally played by Lorna Patterson), and Patti, her young daughter. Laurie is an aspiring actress, and at the end of the movie, Sidney is brokenhearted when she and Patti move to California. Patti is played in the later stages of the movie (once time lapses to her being five years old) by Kaleena Kiff, who retains the role in Love, Sidney.

With the debut of the series, Laurie Morgan (now played by Swoosie Kurtz) and Patti return to New York, following the failure of Laurie's marriage in California. The three characters return to sharing Sidney's Manhattan apartment. Laurie has established herself as an actress in commercials and television roles, and resumes her career in New York, appearing as vixen "Gloria Trenell" on the (fictional) daytime soap opera As Thus We Are. Sidney continues to be a doting father figure to precocious Patti, whose innocence fills his life with sunshine, and provides him with the child he has never had.

Although it is openly acknowledged in the TV movie that Sidney was gay, and had previously been in a relationship with a man, in the series these facts are not stated directly. Instead his sexual orientation is ambiguous and only hinted at, and the "couple" of Laurie and Sidney behave platonically, with only fleeting displays of affection that might be interpreted as romantic.

Sidney speaks at times about his long deceased mother, consistently referring to her as "that terrible woman".

The series depicts Sidney's career as a professional illustrator; his frequent business deals are made with young ad agency director Jason Stoller (Chip Zien), who works at Graham & Ludwig, Sidney's biggest account. Another recurring character in the first season is Sidney's friend and neighbor judge Mort Harris (Alan North), who had a dog named "Rehnquist"—named for then–Associate U.S. Supreme Court Justice William Rehnquist. In the second season, their most prominent neighbor is busybody Mrs. Gaffney (Barbara Bryne), wife of the building's superintendent, who seeks to gain Sidney's affections. Also added to the cast that season is Nancy (Lynne Thigpen), Jason's secretary at Graham & Ludwig.

== Production ==
Sidney Shorr: A Girl's Best Friend went into production during 1980. Network executives planned to use it as a pilot, and develop the movie into a weekly series if it was a success in the ratings. However, after the film was complete, NBC continued to postpone its premiere, and by the end of the 1980–81 season it had not yet aired. Meanwhile, the network had decided to produce the series as part of its 1981 Fall schedule, using the movie as an introduction shortly before its debut.

By the time the series was cast, Lorna Patterson was no longer available, as she had already begun starring on CBS' Private Benjamin; Swoosie Kurtz took over the role of Laurie Morgan. Tony Randall, bitter about regular television roles after the cancellation of his last series The Tony Randall Show (1976–78), was initially uninterested in returning to a television series, but was interested in the "Sidney Shorr" story as a TV movie. Randall agreed to Love, Sidney with two conditions. First, it would provide him extra income that would go toward the financing of the national theatre he wanted to open and run in New York City. (The salary he made over the show's two seasons eventually paid off when his National Actors Theatre opened at NYC's Pace University in 1991.) Secondly, the series had to be taped in New York. During the first season, the series was produced at Reeves Teletape Studios, though the first episode was recorded in Studio 6A at NBC Studios (New York City). Midway through season one, production of Love, Sidney was forced to relocate to Los Angeles for seven episodes because the Teletape studios needed to honor a previous commitment to another production. Those seven episodes were recorded at Warner Bros. in Burbank. Love, Sidney returned to New York for the remainder of its run, taping in various studios, including the CBS Broadcast Center despite being an NBC series.

When the series was announced, NBC received complaints from the Moral Majority and other special-interest groups who were upset about the network presenting a positive portrayal of homosexuality. The lead character's sexuality was kept ambiguous, referred to only in oblique, coded hints. Some TV critics described the character only as a "confirmed bachelor".

The series proved popular among viewers in New York City, where the series was set, particular with its gay male population. The show was also popular in Chicago, Los Angeles, San Francisco, and Seattle. In other markets, however, its ratings ranged from moderately successful to poor.

George Eckstein was the original executive producer from the time of Love, Sidney's premiere. While the series performed well enough for NBC to warrant it a second season, they pushed for changes in order to improve the show's chances for lasting success. At the start of the 1982–83 season, the network hired the veteran producing team of Rod Parker and Hal Cooper to take over the show. With existing producers Ken Hecht and Sandy Veith, they made many changes, including two new regular cast members and a switch to more meaningful, moralized stories which bordered on the "very special episode" format.

The first eight episodes of the second season featured a remixed version of the theme song, sung by Gladys and Bubba Knight. With the November 27, 1982 episode ("Jan, Part 1"), the original version of the theme was reinstated for the title sequence, while the closing credits retained the outro track recorded by the Knights.

Swoosie Kurtz and Tony Randall

As time went on, the writers began to set things up to address Sidney's orientation more directly. The addition of the female neighbor Mrs. Gaffney pursuing a sexual relationship with him offered more opportunities to establish that he was not attracted to women.

In a special hour-long episode aired on May 16, 1983, Sidney agrees to date his new co-worker Allison (Martha Smith), but the courtship ends because of Sidney's lack of passion. He explains that his heart had been broken by a previous long-time love, and he could never love anyone again. Left alone, Allison tearfully remarks about Sidney's former lover: "if only she knew what she was missing", and the camera pans over to a framed photograph of Sidney's former lover Martin, from the pilot movie.

The following episode, the next-to-last in the series, has an openly gay guest character: a psychiatrist who befriends Sidney after the latter talks him out of suicide.

The series was not renewed for a third season.

== Broadcast history ==
Season	Time
1	Wednesday at 9:30-10:00
2	Wednesday at 9:30-10:00 (September 8–15, 1982); Saturday at 9:30-10:00 (October 2 - December 18, 1982); Monday at 8:00-8:30 (March 28 - June 6, 1983)

== US TV ratings ==
Season	Episodes	Premiered:	Ended:	Nielsen rank	Nielsen rating
1	22	October 28, 1981	September 15, 1982	39	N/A
2	22	October 2, 1982	June 6, 1983	80	N/A

== Episodes ==
=== Season 1: 1981–82 ===
No. overall	No. in season	Title	Directed by	Written by	Original release date
1	1	"Welcome Home"	Jay Sandrich	Oliver Hailey	October 28, 1981
2	2	"A Piece of the Rock"	Tony Mordente	Stephen Black, Henry Stern	November 4, 1981
3	3	"The Party"	Jay Sandrich	Robert van Scoyk	November 11, 1981
4	4	"The Cat Burglar"	Mel Ferber	Stephen Black, Henry Stern	November 18, 1981
5	5	"Just Folks"	Mel Ferber	George Geiger	December 2, 1981
6	6	"Run with It"	Mel Ferber	Bob Brunner, Ken Hecht	December 9, 1981
7	7	"Fiddler Under the Roof"	Tony Mordente	Story by : Ernest Chambers & George Eckstein; Teleplay by : Robert van Scoyk	December 16, 1981
8	8	"Hello, Yetta"	Tony Mordente	Story by : Larry Arnstein & David Hurwitz; Teleplay by : Marty Nadler	December 30, 1981
9	9	"Charlotte's Web"	Tony Mordente	Richard Baer	January 13, 1982
10	10	"The Price of Security"	Tony Mordente	Sylvia Alan	January 20, 1982
11	11	"Grade Expectation"	Tony Mordente	Bernard Dilbert	January 27, 1982
12	12	"Sail Away"	Tony Mordente	April Kelly	February 3, 1982
13	13	"Laurie's First Date, A.D."	Tony Mordente	Bob Brunner, Ken Hecht	February 10, 1982
14	14	"Is There Life After Show Business?"	Mel Ferber	Mel Tolkin	February 17, 1982
15	15	"Puppy Love"	Mel Ferber	Story by : Dennis Rinsler & Marc Warren; Teleplay by : April Kelly	February 24, 1982
16	16	"Laurie's Commercial"	Mel Ferber	Story by : Michael Cassutt & Lew Levy; Teleplay by : Marty Nadler & Jim Parker	March 3, 1982
17	17	"Patti, the Torch"	Mel Ferber	April Kelly	March 17, 1982
18	18	"Patti's Roots"	Mel Ferber	Bob Brunner, Ken Hecht	March 31, 1982
19	19	"Visitors from Smoot"	Mel Ferber	Story by : Thelma Herman & David Lyn; Teleplay by : April Kelly	April 7, 1982
20	20	"Sidney and the Actress"	Mel Ferber	Bob Bendetson, Howard Bendetson, Everett Greenbaum, Elliott Reid	June 16, 1982
21	21	"The Activist"	Mel Ferber	Story by : Thelma Herman & David Lyn; Teleplay by : Bob Brunner & Ken Hecht	September 8, 1982
22	22	"Father's Day"	Mel Ferber	Doodles Dubois	September 15, 1982

=== Season 2: 1982–83 ===
No. overall	No. in season	Title	Directed by	Written by	Original release date
23	1	"Pros and Cons"	Hal Cooper	Fredi Towbin	October 2, 1982
24	2	"The Accident"	Hal Cooper	Pamela Chais	October 9, 1982
25	3	"Sidney's Spree"	Hal Cooper	George Arthur Bloom, Sandy Veith	October 16, 1982
26	4	"Sidney's Cousin"	Hal Cooper	Fredi Towbin	October 23, 1982
27	5	"The Anniversary"	Hal Cooper	Pamela Chais	October 30, 1982
28	6	"Rhonda Rabbit"	Hal Cooper	Korby Siamis	November 6, 1982
29	7	"Sitcom"	Hal Cooper	Story by : George Arthur Bloom; Teleplay by : George Arthur Bloom & Sandy Veith	November 13, 1982
30	8	"Jan: Part 1"	Hal Cooper	Rod Parker	November 27, 1982
31	9	"Jan: Part 2"	Hal Cooper	Rod Parker	December 4, 1982
32	10	"Sidney's Hero"	Hal Cooper	Story by : Bob Colleary & Michael Poryes; Teleplay by : Bob Colleary	December 11, 1982
33	11	"Ballet"	Hal Cooper	D. B. Gilles	December 18, 1982
34	12	"One Is Enough"	Hal Cooper	George Arthur Bloom	March 28, 1983
35	13	"Show Biz Mamas"	Hal Cooper	George Arthur Bloom, Arthur Julian	April 4, 1983
36	14	"Blinded"	Hal Cooper	Pamela Chais	April 11, 1983
37	15	"Sidney's Bar Mitzvah"	Hal Cooper	Arthur Julian	April 18, 1983
38	16	"The Movie"	Hal Cooper	Korby Siamis	April 25, 1983
39	17	"Sidney's Art Show"	Hal Cooper	Karyl Miller	May 2, 1983
40	18	"The Revolutionary"	Hal Cooper	Story by : George Arthur Bloom & Bob Colleary; Teleplay by : Bob Colleary	May 9, 1983
41	19	"Alison: Part 1"	Hal Cooper	Pamela Chais	May 16, 1983
42	20	"Alison: Part 2"	Hal Cooper	Pamela Chais	May 16, 1983
43	21	"The Shrink"	Hal Cooper	Pamela Chais	May 30, 1983
44	22	"Surprise Party"	Hal Cooper	George Arthur Bloom	June 6, 1983
