= A Woman of Independent Means =

1995 American television miniseries

- Home video cover art
- Based on: A Woman of Independent Means by Elizabeth Forsythe Hailey
- Screenplay by: Cindy Myers
- Directed by: Robert Greenwald
- Starring: Sally Field; Ron Silver; Tony Goldwyn; Jack Thompson; Sheila McCarthy; Brenda Fricker; Charles Durning
- Composer: Laura Karpman
- Country of origin: United States
- Original language: English
- No. of episodes: 3

Production
- Executive producer: Sally Field
- Producer: Robert Greenwald
- Cinematography: Steven Shaw
- Editor: Éva Gárdos
- Running time: 360 minutes
- Production companies: Robert Greenwald Productions; Fogwood Films

Original release
- Network: NBC
- Release: February 19 – February 22, 1995

A Woman of Independent Means is a 1995 American period drama television miniseries directed and produced by Robert Greenwald from a teleplay by Cindy Myers, based on the 1978 book of the same name by Elizabeth Forsythe Hailey. The miniseries stars Sally Field (who also served as an executive producer), with Ron Silver, Tony Goldwyn, Jack Thompson, Sheila McCarthy, Brenda Fricker, and Charles Durning in supporting roles. It follows for some seven decades the story of Bess Alcott, from her Dallas marriage to her fourth-grade sweetheart Robert Steed to the birth of three children to the fussings with grandchildren.

The miniseries received four Primetime Emmy Award nominations, including Outstanding Miniseries and Outstanding Lead Actress in a Miniseries or a Special for Field, winning one for its costume design. Field was also nominated for a Golden Globe Award and a Screen Actors Guild Award for her performance.

== Cast ==
- Sally Field as Bess Alcott Steed Garner
- Ron Silver as Arthur Fineman
- Tony Goldwyn as Robert Steed
- Jack Thompson as Sam Garner
- Sheila McCarthy as Totsie
- Brenda Fricker as Mother Steed
- Charles Durning as Andrew Alcott
- Ann Hearn as Lydia
- Lawrence Monoson as Walter Burton
- Richard Dillard as Richard Prince
- John S. Davies as Howard Blackstone
- Rutherford Cravens as Marvin Hamilton
- Andrea Roth as Eleanor Steed
  - Emmy Barker as Eleanor Steed (teen)
  - Christina Stojanovich as Eleanor Steed (child)
- Andrew Lowery as Drew Steed
  - Christopher Fox as Drew Steed (teen)
  - Cameron Finley as Drew Steed (child)
- Matthew Loehr as Robin Steed
  - Trevor Meeks as Robin Steed (child)
- John Slattery as Dwight
- Margaret Bowman as Old Nanny
- Pam Dougherty as Second Jessamine Sister
- Jimmy Ray Pickens as St. Louis Bellhop
- Gena Sleete as Mrs. Maxwell
- Angie Bolling as Mrs. Fleck
- Rodger Boyce as Eleanor's Doctor

== Episodes ==
No.	Title	Directed by	Written by	Original release date
1	"Part I"	Robert Greenwald	Cindy Myers	February 19, 1995
2	"Part II"	Robert Greenwald	Cindy Myers	February 20, 1995
3	"Part III"	Robert Greenwald	Cindy Myers	February 22, 1995

== Reception ==
=== Critical response ===
A Woman of Independent Means received praise for the performances of the cast, particularly that of Sally Field. Tony Scott of Variety stated that Robert Greenwald "with the reminiscing Bess as his constant object, directs Field and the large cast with admirable skill". Ken Tucker of Entertainment Weekly gave the miniseries a grade of B, writing that it "has a pleasingly diffuse, almost aimless structure" and "is stubbornly, intriguingly true to its title". Tom Shales of The Washington Post described it as "an absurdly lengthy parade of episodes, some of them admittedly moving, that fails to achieve any kind of meaningful cumulative impact".

=== Accolades ===
Year	Award	Category	Nominee(s)	Result	Ref.
1995	Artios Awards	Best Casting for TV Mini-Series	Wendy Kurtzman	Nominated	
1995	Primetime Emmy Awards	Outstanding Miniseries	Sally Field, Robert Greenwald, Philip Kleinbart, Preston Fischer, and Steve Saeta	Nominated	
1995	Primetime Emmy Awards	Outstanding Lead Actress in a Miniseries or a Special	Sally Field	Nominated	
1995	Primetime Emmy Awards	Outstanding Individual Achievement in Casting	Wendy Kurtzman	Nominated	
1995	Primetime Emmy Awards	Outstanding Individual Achievement in Costume Design for a Miniseries or a Special	Julie Weiss (for "Part I")	Won	
1996	Golden Globe Awards	Best Actress in a Miniseries or Motion Picture Made for Television	Sally Field	Nominated	
1996	Screen Actors Guild Awards	Outstanding Performance by a Female Actor in a Miniseries or Television Movie	Sally Field	Nominated	
