= Isabel's Choice =

1981 television film directed by Guy Green

- Genre: Drama
- Written by: Oliver Hailey
- Directed by: Guy Green
- Starring: Jean Stapleton; Richard Kiley; Peter Coyote; Betsy Palmer
- Music by: Glenn Paxton
- Country of origin: United States
- Original language: English

Production
- Producers: Stuart Millar; Gabriel Katzka
- Cinematography: Frank Beascoechea
- Editor: Aaron Stell
- Running time: 96 minutes
- Production company: Stuart Millar-Pantheon Television

Original release
- Network: CBS
- Release: December 16, 1981

Isabel's Choice is a 1981 American made-for-television drama film directed by Guy Green, starring Jean Stapleton, Richard Kiley, Peter Coyote and Betsy Palmer. It was broadcast on CBS as The CBS Wednesday Night Movie on December 16, 1981.

== Synopsis ==
Isabel Cooper (Jean Stapleton) is a widow who prides herself on her years of devotion and loyalty as secretary to Lyman James (Richard Kiley), a top executive in a large corporation. Lyman retires when a dynamic young executive, Wynn Thomas (Peter Coyote) is hired to assume the presidency Lyman thought would be his. Under Thomas' presidency, Isabel is promoted to an executive position that she had worked towards for several years. Lyman later seeks comfort in Isabel when his wife is killed suddenly in a plane crash. As Lyman and Isabel's relationship progresses, he plans to propose and assumes that she will end her career to stay home with him. Isabel is forced to choose between the executive life she worked so hard to establish and the comforts of marriage that Lyman is willing to offer.

== Cast ==
- Jean Stapleton as Isabel Cooper
- Richard Kiley as Lyman Jones
- Peter Coyote as Wynn Thomas
- Betsy Palmer as Ellie Fineman
- Mildred Dunnock as Helen
- Sally Kemp as Miss Hamilton
- Irene Tedrow as Mrs. Harper
- Douglas Robinson as Supervisor
- Howard Morton as Miles

== Home media release ==
The film was released on VHS in 1989 by Bridgestone Multimedia Group and has long been out of print. To date, it has not been released on DVD.
