= I Won't Dance (play) =

Comedic play

- Written by: Oliver Hailey

Premiere
- Date premiered: May 10, 1981

I Won't Dance is a 1981 comedic play written by Oliver Hailey. The play follows a paraplegic man named Dom in the aftermath of the murders of his brother and sister-in-law.

It was first produced on Broadway and opened at the Helen Hayes Theatre on May 10, 1981. The Broadway production was directed by Tom O'Horgan, and starred David Selby as Dom, Gail Strickland as Lil, and Arlene Golonka as Kay. The production closed on the same day it opened, playing a total of 12 previews and one regular performance.

A revival of the play was directed by Jean Hauser for the Gaslamp Quarter Theatre in San Diego in 1987. Another revival by the Rivoli Stage Company played at the Williams Center in Rutherford, New Jersey, in 1991.

Theatre and disability has grown as a movement and portrayal of characters like these characters is subject to greater scrutiny, as disabled actors are more commonly authentically cast, reclaiming disabled stories, bringing authenticity, subtext and postmodern perspective of disability in performance.
