= Kendall Hailey =

American writer and autodidact

Kendall Hailey is an American writer and autodidact. She graduated from high school a year early, at age 16, to pursue unschooling and wrote about her experiences in the book, The Day I Became an Autodidact and the Advice, Adventures, and Acrimonies that Befell Me Thereafter (Delacorte Press, ISBN 0-385-29636-3, and Bantam Dell Publishing Group, New York, 1988, ISBN 0-440-55013-0). The book details first her decision to leave formal education, and follows her as she sets out to read everything ever published.

She is a daughter of playwright Oliver Hailey and novelist Elizabeth Forsythe Hailey.
