= Sidney Shorr: A Girl's Best Friend =

1981 television drama film directed by Russ Mayberry

- Based on: Short story
- Written by: Oliver Hailey
- Story by: Marilyn Cantor Baker
- Directed by: Russ Mayberry
- Starring: Tony Randall; Lorna Patterson; Kaleena Kiff; David Huffman
- Music by: Billy Goldenberg
- Country of origin: United States
- Original language: English

Production
- Producer: George Eckstein
- Cinematography: Chuck Arnold
- Editor: Jim Benson
- Running time: 95 minutes
- Production companies: Hajeno Productions; Warner Bros. Television

Original release
- Network: NBC
- Release: October 5, 1981

Related
- Love, Sidney

Sidney Shorr: A Girl's Best Friend is a 1981 American made-for-television drama film written by Oliver Hailey and directed by Russ Mayberry. The film is based on a short story by Marilyn Cantor Baker. It stars Tony Randall, Lorna Patterson, Kaleena Kiff and David Huffman.

It premiered on NBC as a two-hour pilot for the NBC series Love, Sidney on October 5, 1981. Oliver Hailey and Marilyn Cantor Baker won a Writers Guild of America Award for Best Comedy Anthology - Original or Adapted and it was nominated for a Primetime Emmy Award for Outstanding Writing for a Limited Series, Movie, or Dramatic Special. The movie was one of prime time's first depictions of a gay man on television, and was protested by conservative organizations.

== Plot ==
When we first meet Sidney, a reclusive illustrator, his mother has recently died, and his live-in lover Martin has left him. Then on a rainy evening, Sidney befriends Laurie Morgan, who spends the night in his apartment due to the rain. Laurie very quickly identifies Sidney's sexuality from his longing gaze towards a man's photo on the mantle. Since Sidney can no longer afford his apartment alone, he invites her to move in. She eventually finds work in commercials, and later on a soap opera.

Sidney is a jealous roommate though, and Laurie resents his constant complaints about her being too promiscuous. When Laurie learns she is pregnant and her boyfriend is married, Sidney comforts her. She then decides to have an abortion, but Sidney begs her not to. Laurie agrees to keep her baby, and Sidney helps out with parenting responsibilities and financial support.

Flash forward five years, and they are seen as a happy family. But when her new boyfriend Jimmy proposes marriage, Laurie accepts and announces they are moving to Los Angeles. Sidney objects and files for joint custody of the child. When Sidney and Laurie meet with Judge Wilcox, Sidney makes an impassioned plea to keep the child, but ultimately, one of them must say goodbye to Patti.

== Cast ==
- Tony Randall as Sidney Shorr
- Lorna Patterson as Laurie Morgan
- Kaleena Kiff as Patti
- David Huffman as Jimmy
- Tom Villard as Eric
- Ann Weldon as Judge Wilcox
- John Lupton as Frank
- Martin Rudy as Mallory
- Tom Fuccello as Reiss

== History and production notes ==
In late 1979, Randall was approached about a made-for-TV movie, based on a short story by Marilyn Cantor Baker. The project was still in development, and since he liked the premise of the story, he immediately expressed interest. Randall later explained the reason behind his involvement in the project was because he "fell in love" with the character Sidney. Randall liked the idea of a lonely middle-aged man achieving something he always wanted, the unexpected gift of a family. With Randall on board, Warner Bros. Television took on the project, which they planned to offer to CBS.

They hired writer Oliver Hailey, best known for Mary Hartman, Mary Hartman, to adapt Baker's short story into a screenplay. Hailey worked closely with Randall and together they developed an acceptable script. When they eventually took it to CBS, they rejected it, despite cautious treatment of its potentially controversial theme. Randall told The Advocate, the rejection couldn't be related to the homosexuality, because television had already covered that subject. They approached Fred Silverman next, president of NBC at the time, and according to Hailey, he "went apeshit" over the script. Silverman bought it, and quickly put the film into production. Russ Mayberry was hired to direct, Lorna Patterson was cast as Laurie Morgan, and Kaleena Kiff was selected to play Patti. The movie was taped in New York, and was completed in the fall of 1980.

Hailey later revealed that many of his ideas for the movie were vetoed by Randall, whose contract allowed him creative control of the project. Hailey wanted to provide details about Sidney's doomed relationship with his ex-lover Martin, and also proposed that Martin might return and clash with Laurie. However, his suggestions were overruled by Randall. He insisted that Martin would only be represented by a photo of him on the mantelpiece. According to Hailey, Randall wanted Sidney's sexuality to be specified, but it would be solely through inference, neither gay nor homosexual were to be spoken aloud.

== Criticism and protests ==
After it was completed, the broadcast premiere was postponed for almost a year, despite NBC being pleased with the results. When Ronald Reagan won the election in 1980, conservative organizations like the Moral Majority, founded by Jerry Falwell, and Donald Wildmon's National Federation for Decency, coordinated massive letter-writing campaigns and boycotts against TV networks that broadcast any programs that they perceived as immoral. Wildmon was quoted as saying, "networks make a mistake when they try to legitimize a homosexual lifestyle".

Letters protesting the project started to arrive at NBC even before shooting had finished on the movie, and after filming had wrapped, NBC received hundreds more protesting its broadcast. Alan Shayne, president of Warner Bros. Television, was still passionate about the movie, despite the pressure from conservative organizations. Early in 1981, Shayne decided to ignore the pressure groups and take them on directly. He would develop the project into a weekly series and treat the film as its pilot. The decision was green-lighted by Silverman, and achieved a television breakthrough by featuring a TV program built around a gay character, played by an established star. When Grant Tinker took over at NBC after Silverman's departure, he said Jerry Falwell is "just another viewer", and he "won't do my job for me". For his part, Randall was quite vocal in response to the backlash against the film and series being developed, he flat out replied "screw 'em".

== Reception and ratings ==
When the movie finally premiered in 1981, it was greeted with mixed but mostly positive reviews, with Randall receiving some of the best reviews of his career for his performance. It also scored well in the ratings, drawing 40 percent of the viewing audience in New York City, while drawing 28 percent nationally. Oliver Hailey, who stayed on with the series as a story consultant, called the movie's premiere "a timid groundbreaker".

Opposition to the film came from an unlikely source, Newt Dieter, of the Los Angeles-based Gay Media Task Force, bluntly called the film "a piece of shit". He stated that "Sidney was a plausible character", but was still disappointed, because the "man's sexual identity was so understated as to be irrelevant. Why, Dieter asked, was he even made a homosexual in the first place?"

== See also ==
- Culture war
- List of made-for-television films with LGBT characters
