= The Man in the Moon (Pontiac Star Parade) =

The Man in the Moon is an American musical variety television special broadcast by NBC on April 16, 1960. It was directed by Barry Shear and co-written by Mel Brooks.

== Cast ==
- Andy Williams
- Tony Randall
- Lisa Kirk
- Diahann Carroll
- Bambi Linn
- James Mitchell
- Cloris Leachman
- Jester Hairston
