= Marilyn Cantor Baker =

American actress & author (1921–2010)

- Born: Marilyn Cantor; September 16, 1921; New York City
- Died: September 17, 2010 (aged 89); New York City

Marilyn Cantor Baker (September 16, 1921 – September 17, 2010) was an American actress, author, writer, producer, and comedian. She appeared on Broadway and smaller theaters, in nightclubs, on television, and on radio.

== Early life and education ==
Baker was born in New York City on September 16, 1921 to Eddie Cantor, a star of stage, screen, and radio as well as a songwriter and singer, and his wife Ida. She was their fourth daughter, and named after actress Marilyn Miller, whom Eddie had acted with. The family was Jewish.

Baker graduated from the American Academy of Dramatic Arts in New York in 1945. While studying, she supported herself as a secretary, and as a radio announcer during World War II.

== Career ==
Upon graduation, she got bit parts in small productions the summer of 1945, and briefly worked in musical theater under the stage name Marilyn Curtis in the fall. She was also worked during that period as a disc jockey catering to children on New York's WHN radio station, becoming the first woman disc jockey in the city.

By 1950 she was headlining at nightclubs and producing her own shows.

In 1956 and 1957, she appeared in some of the early telethons for United Cerebral Palsy. She started her long-time volunteer work promoting Israel Bonds around 1958, an effort to help financially support the new Jewish state of Israel.

She appeared on stage and television with her father a number of times.

In 1970, she produced the off-Broadway musical Lyle, based on the Lyle books by Bernard Waber. Her sister, Janet Cantor Gari, was the show's music director.

Baker wrote the short story Sidney Shorr, which in 1981 was adapted into a film and a television show called Love, Sidney.

== Personal life ==
She married Michael Baker in 1960. Newspaper accounts gave her age as 33 at the time, but she was actually 39. Together, they had a daughter, Lynne, and a son, Jed. They were married for over 50 years at her death in New York City on September 17, 2010.

Daughter Lynne married Andrew (Drew) Eichner but later divorced him. They have three sons.

Son Jedediah married Beth Sklar on January 9, 1999 They have a son and a daughter.
