= Elizabeth Forsythe Hailey =

American journalist and playwright (born 1938)

Elizabeth Forsythe Hailey (born August 31, 1938 in Dallas, Texas) is an American journalist and playwright.

== Career ==
She studied at the Sorbonne in Paris and received her Bachelor's Degree from Hollins College, now Hollins University in Roanoke, Virginia in 1960. In the same year she married Oliver Hailey, a playwright and the father of her daughters. She worked briefly in journalism and publishing before joining her husband in writing for film and television. They served as creative consultants for the popular television series Mary Hartman, Mary Hartman.

Her first novel A Woman of Independent Means, a surprise best seller, published in 1978, the year she turned forty, was inspired by the life of her grandmother. With the support of her husband, playwright Oliver Hailey, she adapted it for the stage in 1983 as a one-person play starring Barbara Rush. The play won the Los Angeles Critics Award. In 1995, A Woman of Independent Means became a six-hour NBC miniseries starring Sally Field. She subsequently published three more best-selling novels: Life Sentences (1982), Joanna's Husband and David's Wife (1986—which she also adapted for the stage as a two-person play), and Home Free in 1991.

== Personal life ==
Hailey was born the oldest of four children of Earl Andrew Forsythe, an attorney, and Janet Kendall Forsythe. She and her late husband, playwright Oliver Hailey, have two daughters, Kendall Hailey and Brooke Hailey Egan.

== Bibliography ==
- A Woman of Independent Means, 1978
- Life Sentences, 1982
- Joanna's Husband and David's Wife, 1987
- Home Free, 1991
