= D. B. Gilles =

American screenwriter and playwright

- Occupations: Screenwriter, playwright

D.B. Gilles is an American screenwriter, playwright, academic, script consultant and writing coach specializing in screenplays, TV pilots, plays and novels.

== Career ==
Gilles' plays Inadmissible and Sparkling Object had their world premieres at The Canal Park Playhouse, a new theater in Tribeca in New York City. Four of his plays are published by Dramatists Play Service: The Girl Who Loved The Beatles, The Legendary Stardust Boys, Cash Flow and Men's Singles. He is the creator of seven pilots, among them, for CBS: The Late Bloomer and Man of the House. He wrote for Herman's Head, Love, Sidney and Barclay's Beat starring Jeff Garland. For the screen, he adapted the play Spinning Into Butter starring Sarah Jessica Parker. His screenplays include Thinly Disguised, High D/Low C and Dashing Through The Snow. His novels include The Pug That Ate Paris, a humorous novel about a Paris-based talking dog food critic bon vivant. He also wrote The Eiffel Tower Prophecy which is a Paris time-travel novel. In 2013 his parody on the pundit Ann Coulter came out: Never Trust Ann Coulter: An Unauthorized, Autobiographical Parody.

Gilles is co-author with Sheldon Woodbury of the George W. Bush parody W. The First Hundred Days: A White House Journal. His article "How Old Is Too Old To Be A Screenwriter" is published in the anthology Ask The Pros: 200 Questions Answered By Industry Professionals (Lone Eagle Publishing, a division of iFilm). His article "The Cat Therapist and Other Sitcoms Not To Be" was published in The New York Times Arts & Leisure Section. His article on screenwriting "The Short Attention Span Screenwriter" is a popular Internet download.

== Teaching ==
D.B. Gilles teaches Screenwriting, Comedy Writing and Writing For Television (both sitcom and hour-long drama) in The Maurice Kanbar Institute of Film & Television at New York University's Tisch School of the Arts. He teaches television writing and comedy in The Gallatin School of Individualized Study at NYU. He has also taught Playwriting and Screenwriting in The Department of Dramatic Writing at NYU and in the Graduate Film Department at Columbia University.

== Works ==
=== Plays ===
- Cash Flow
- The Girl Who Loved The Beatles
- The Legendary Stardust Boys
- Men's Singles

=== Print ===
- 50 Screenwriting Tips For $5. (CreateSpace Independent Publishing Platform, 2017)
- Your Screenplay Needs A Little Help. (CreateSpace Independent Publishing Platform, 2017)
- The Portable Film School: Everything You'd Learn in Film School (Without Ever Going to Class). (St. Martin's Press, 2005).
- Screenwriters Rehab: A 12-Step Program For Writers Who Can't Get Their Acts Together. (CreateSpace Independent Publishing Platform, 2017)
- The Pug That Ate Paris (CreateSpace Independent Publishing Platform, 2017)
- The Eiffel Tower Prophecy (A Paris Time Travel Novel)
- Never Trust Ann Coulter: An Unauthorized, Autobiographical Parody
- You're Funny! Turn Your Sense of Humor Into A Lucrative New Career (Michael Wiese Productions, 2011)
- I Hate My Bookclub
- Girl Found Dead
- W. The First Hundred Days: A White House Journal (2001 Andrews McMeel)
- The Short Attention Span Screenwriter
- "The Cat Therapist and Other Sitcoms Not To Be" in The New York Times
- "How Old Is Too Old To Be A Screenwriter" in Ask The Pros: 200 Questions Answered By Industry Professionals (Lone Eagle Publishing)
