= Herman's Head =

American television series (1991–94)

- Title card for the second and third seasons of Herman's Head
- Genre: Sitcom
- Created by: Andy Guerdat; Steve Kreinberg
- Directed by: J.D. Lobue; Greg Antonacci
- Starring: William Ragsdale; Hank Azaria; Jane Sibbett; Yeardley Smith; Molly Hagan; Ken Hudson Campbell; Rick Lawless; Peter MacKenzie; Jason Bernard
- Theme music composer: Nick South; Tom Strahle
- Opening theme: Bill Bodine (1991–92); G*N*G Music (1992–93); Mark Nilan (1993–94)
- Ending theme: Rich Eames; Scott Gale
- Country of origin: United States
- Original language: English
- No. of seasons: 3
- No. of episodes: 72 (list of episodes)

Production
- Executive producers: David Babcock; Paul Junger Witt; David Landsberg; Tony Thomas
- Producers: Stephen Kurzfeld; Roberto Benabib; Karl Fink; Bill Freiberger; Joel Madison; Michael B. Kaplan; Mark Ganzel; Nina Feinberg; Adam Markowitz
- Camera setup: Multi-camera
- Running time: 22–24 minutes
- Production companies: Touchstone Television; Witt/Thomas Productions

Original release
- Network: Fox
- Release: September 8, 1991 – April 21, 1994

Herman's Head is an American sitcom that aired on the Fox network from September 8, 1991, until April 21, 1994. The series was created by Andy Guerdat and Steve Kreinberg, and produced by Witt/Thomas Productions in association with Touchstone Television. William Ragsdale stars as the title character, Herman Brooks. Herman's thought processes are dramatized in a "Greek chorus"-style interpretation, with four characters representing different aspects of his personality (played by Molly Hagan, Ken Hudson Campbell, Rick Lawless and Peter Mackenzie).

== Synopsis ==
Research assistant Herman Brooks (William Ragsdale) works in the fact-checking department of a major magazine publisher, Waterton Publishing, in Manhattan. Herman, from all outward appearances, embodies the young man on the fast track—ambitious, clever, and sensible. However, viewers are shown that a struggle of contrasting personality traits are constantly working, and most often arguing, inside his head. His decisions and actions are dramatized with a "Greek chorus"-style interpretation of his thought processes.

=== The psyche ===
The four characters acting out Herman's emotions each represent a different aspect of his personality, or psyche. As they were intended to be one-dimensional, they often lack in other areas of their character, leading to frequent squabbles. The characters act in unison when Herman's body is affected, such as having to sneeze, or crying out in pain after being punched in the stomach. They also team up and form factions.

- "Angel" (Molly Hagan) represents his sensitivity. As the only female character in his brain, Angel also represents his feminine side and sometimes uses this fact to manipulate the male characters. She also clashes with Animal about how to treat women because while she wants to treat them with sensitivity and kindness, Animal just wants to have sex.
- "Animal" (Ken Hudson Campbell) represents his basic drives of lust and hunger. He is a caricature of college fraternities. In one episode, when Herman's personalities are assessing a sleazy man (Campbell in a dual role) dating Louise, Animal sticks up for him because the man looks and acts exactly like him.
- "Wimp" (Rick Lawless) represents Herman's anxiety. He is a paranoid hypochondriac, and since he always expects the worst, he is often the best prepared to handle crises when others can not decide.
- "Genius" (Peter Mackenzie) represents his intellect and logic and often clashes with Angel's naïveté and Animal's stupidity. At times he can get overworked; as in one episode where Herman makes a ridiculous decision, Genius's face is blackened by soot and he exclaims "I think I blew a fuse."
- "Jealousy" (Bobcat Goldthwait) only appears once, when Herman and his sister find themselves in competition for a job. He causes so much confusion and chaos that the original four selves throw him out of the door, followed by a hand grenade.
- "God" (Leslie Nielsen) was a guest star in an episode when Herman had a fling with a married woman which both had come to regret. God's appearance to the four was also due to the fact that Herman's uncle was undergoing major surgery and his entire family had been praying over it, save for Herman. When Genius protests that "You are not God, you are Leslie Nielsen", God says that everyone has their own idea of His personal appearance, and "you, Herman, chose to portray me as Leslie Nielsen".

Herman's "head" characters exist in a large attic room filled with toys, a lit Christmas tree, a rose-covered bower, theater seats, neon signs, arcade games, pennants and memorabilia from Ohio State University, old furniture, and numerous file cabinets (with labels like "memories", "fantasies" and "sexual past"). They watch "films" of past events and enact possible scenarios for what might happen in Herman's various life situations, occasionally venturing into Hammer Films movie territory or (in the case of Animal) pornographic films.

=== Friends, co-workers, and bosses ===
Much of the show's action is situated at the Waterton research department, where personal situations (ranging from old friends from the past, various dates, sexual liaisons, and the like) seem to cross professional ones for Herman on a daily basis. Herman also has a studio apartment located downtown, which, in a first-season episode, is indicated as being a somewhat lengthy subway ride from the Waterton offices. The only other recurring setting is MacAnally's, a restaurant and pub, which presumably is located between Herman's residence and the Waterton offices. It attracts a rather upscale clientele, and it most often sets the stage for Herman's and the other characters' romantic pursuits. The regular real-life characters are as follows:

- Jay Nichols (Hank Azaria) is Herman's best friend, a resident writer for Waterton who works upstairs. Prior to the timeline of the series, he had helped Herman land a job as a fact-checker in the research department. A smooth-talking ladies' man, Jay often is more gutsy when it comes to pursuing women, and typically, is subject to periodic rejection from women who do not tolerate his machismo and clichéd pick-up lines. He is often looked to by Herman as a level of confidence to aspire to, while Jay eventually ponders how Herman's more cautious, "nice guy" persona could work to his advantage. He has also made Herman feel insecure at times because of his position in the company being higher than Herman's. A frequent visitor to the research department, Jay always drops in to have a spirited conversation with his best buddy, whom he always calls "Hermo", "The Hermster", or some variation thereof. Originally, Jay is exclusively seen chasing after flashy, status-conscious women, most notably Heddy Newman, who continually turns him down and gives him very little acknowledgment during his visits to the research department. He was engaged to a woman he was hopelessly in love with, but she left him at the altar—which nearly destroyed him. And so he now regards relationships with women as just for sex. His ex-fiancée returns and he falls back in love with her. He prepares to leave all of New York to go away with her, but she abandons him again. Jay pretends he left her this time, but Herman pretends he does not know that she left him. By the third season, Herman fixes up Jay with Louise Fitzer, and the two become an item. They begin to fall in love with each other.
- Heddy Newman (Jane Sibbett) is a fact checker in the research department who works alongside Herman. She is an ice princess obsessed with financial and social status and is inclined to step on anyone she can to get ahead. She most often attempts to manipulate Herman, whom she sees as an easy target due to his mild-mannered disposition and honest work ethic. Heddy's most common ploy is to blame her often chafing work effort on Herman, especially when it would come to the attention of her boss, Paul Bracken. Her aggressive nature sometimes leads her over the edge, as when she deliberately steals a speech that was to be read at a party celebrating Mr. Bracken's 20th anniversary at Waterton, which Herman had written for himself. She claimed the speech as her own after Herman had too much alcohol to drink (in an effort to combat his nervousness), forcing him to make a drunken display at the party which nearly gets him fired. Heddy somehow loses to Herman in the end each time and does receive discipline from Mr. Bracken, but being a TV show, she always remains in her job. She often blames her being passed over at work on "being a woman in a man's world"—but this is obviously just an excuse. Over time, Heddy and Herman gain a better understanding of each other's personalities and lives and move toward becoming allies. Heddy moves into Herman's apartment building in the third season, and shortly thereafter, the two actually admit to romantic feelings, and begin to date. Keeping true to her character, however, Heddy soon breaks up with Herman, citing that his financial prospects are not up to her standards. Herman falls out of love with her immediately.
- Louise Fitzer (Yeardley Smith) is the diminutive, devoted secretary to research department head Paul Bracken. She is honest, diligent, and sweet, but alternates these qualities often with a large dose of sardonicism. Her dedication to service and accuracy is matched with Mr. Bracken, so much so that she recites random, encyclopedic facts in quick succession, without taking a breath, when Mr. Bracken requests them on the fly. Louise is often the more innocent force in the office, compared to the rapid-fire interaction among Herman, Heddy, and Jay. She is arguably the most sound source of advice for Herman in the physical world, aside from the reasoning that Angel, Animal, Wimp, and Genius do in his brain. Louise also has sympathy for Herman whenever he plays office politics with Heddy, or occasionally, with Mr. Bracken. She is portrayed as having low self-esteem, which leads to a stagnant dating life, and gets comfort from Herman. Louise eventually finds herself attracted to Jay, who indeed returns the feelings, and with Herman's urging, the two agree to a date. This culminates in an on-again, off-again relationship between the two.
- Mr. Paul Bracken (Jason Bernard) is the head of research at Waterton Publishing. A strict but fair man who, in the first season, is celebrating twenty years with the company, Mr. Bracken often has forfeited vacation time and attention to his wife to fully serve in his job. Mr. Bracken puts on a gruff, hard-nosed facade and takes great pride in throwing around his weight, but can soften up and offer praise when it is due, especially to Herman, who is more than likely the hardest working fact checker in the department. In fact, Mr. Bracken is so partial to Herman that he saves him from getting fired, by telling company executive Mr. Crawford and other chairmen that he has never known Herman to be a heavy drinker, after Herman's erratic behavior at his anniversary party. Conversely, Mr. Bracken is all too knowing of Heddy's behavior, and swiftly rebuffs her kissing up to him, as well as all the lies she tells about her work progress. Bracken also suffers a heart attack early in the run, which convinces him to loosen up and, finally, pay more attention to his wife. His daughter Susan (played by Victoria Rowell) surfaces for two episodes in the second season and turns out to be Herman's ex-girlfriend. Bracken also has a niece, Rene (played by Karen Malina White), who guest stars early in the third season, when Herman convinces her to audition for the role of a Fly Girl on In Living Color.
- Mr. Crawford (Edward Winter) is the occasionally seen Waterton executive. His seemingly honorable persona always masks an unbelievable cluelessness, and more often, he is saying the wrong thing. Crawford, like Mr. Bracken, takes time to compliment Herman on his fine work, but despite doing so numerous times over the course of the series, can never remember Herman's name—calling him "Sherman." He eventually becomes an ally and father figure to Herman. He is a rich eccentric, who comes across as completely insane.

Dave Madden provided voice-over narration of the show's concept during the first season's opening title sequence.

== Episodes ==
Season	Episodes	Originally released	
Season	Episodes	First released	Last released
1	25	September 8, 1991	May 10, 1992
2	25	September 13, 1992	May 9, 1993
3	22	September 16, 1993	April 21, 1994

== Development, reception and cancellation ==
The original working title for the series was It's All in Your Head, and the producers also attempted to use the title Inside Herman's Head. Creators Andy Guerdat and Steve Kreinberg had first worked for Witt/Thomas as writers on It's a Living; in the midst of this writing stint, Guerdat and Kreinberg additionally landed their first producing job, on the first-run syndication revival of 9 to 5. It was their experience in workplace comedy on 9 to 5 that led the two into situating Herman's Head largely in the same setting.

The show suffered from poor ratings and was canceled after three seasons.

In the final episode of the series, Herman is hit by a car and spends the episode lying in a hospital room near death. His coworkers speak of remembering Herman as they first met him, and we see each of the selves filling in for the emotion the friend first saw Herman displaying. Meanwhile, William Ragsdale appears as a head character, Herman's spirit. He announces his determination to keep the group alive, declaring "I'll be all that's left after Herman Brooks is gone." Animal immediately moans, "Oh my God, you're our student loan!"

=== Proposed storyline plans ===
When Herman's Head was still on the air, one of its writers was a regular contributor to an online BBS forum devoted to Fox shows. He had stated in the forum that if the series were to continue for a fourth season, four new "head characters" were going to be added for Heddy so that viewers could see the inner workings of her head. Thus, a new angle to the show would have been added, as it would have been finally understood what made Heddy tick, and had motivated her to be so haughty and manipulative. Her head activity would have run in tandem with Herman's. With Fox's cancellation of the series after season three, the exploration of "Heddy's head" was never introduced. The storyline addition was viewed to have made sense, as viewers predicted that Herman and Heddy were still destined to wind up together just as Jay and Louise had.

== In popular culture ==
=== The Simpsons impact ===
Both Hank Azaria and Yeardley Smith are cast members of The Simpsons, which debuted on Fox two seasons earlier. One episode had Yeardley Smith's character, Louise, after hanging up the telephone, ask her colleague across the room, "Herman, I don't sound like that Lisa Simpson, do I?" A similar reference occurs when Mr. Bracken receives a complaint about one of the workers. The complainant did not get the worker's name but reported that she sounded like a cartoon character. After some furtive glances from Louise, Mr. Bracken dresses down a female coworker who sounds like Betty Boop.

The Simpsons also referenced Herman's Head when Lisa (voiced by Smith) is asked what she is laughing at in the episode "Duffless"; she replies that she has just remembered "a joke I saw on Herman's Head." In the later episode "Marge vs. Singles, Seniors, Childless Couples and Teens, and Gays", when Marge Simpson asks him to sign a petition, Comic Book Guy (voiced by Azaria) explains that he only signs petitions to bring back television shows, exclaiming "America needs the wisdom of Herman's Head now more than ever." Further, Lisa is revealed to have a Herman's Head-like chorus of her own, seen when she is processing feelings of jealousy over Marge's publishing a novel. When asked about Herman's Head on a Simpsons commentary, Azaria said people were discussing shows that actors would rather forget, stating that he "always had that. I didn't love Herman's Head, really."

=== Other ===
During the November 17, 1991, broadcast of Herman's Head ("Near-Death Wish"), the very first commercial advertisement for condoms aired in the United States.

During the 2012 United States presidential election, former Herman's Head actors Molly Hagan, Ken Hudson Campbell and Peter Mackenzie reunited to make a video parody for the comedy site Funny or Die, titled "Herman Cain's Head"; it referenced then-presidential candidate Herman Cain.

In 2021, the "To Protect and Serve" episode of Only Murders in the Building opens with a character watching Herman's Head and describing the show's personal importance as she was growing up. The episode's ending bookends this as she muses over whether Herman's Head "ended with him finally getting the girl," suspecting he would have continued without "those advisors in his head anymore" because he would not need them once he was no longer alone.

== See also ==
- Dream On (1990)
- Mental Block (2003)
- Nōnai Poison Berry (2009)
- Inside Out (2015)
- Yumi's Cells (2015)
- Madly (2025)
