= Oliver Hailey =

American screenwriter and playwright (1932–1993)

- Born: July 7, 1932; Pampa, Texas, US
- Died: January 23, 1993 (aged 60); Los Angeles, California, US
- Occupations: Screenwriter, playwright
- Spouse: Elizabeth Forsythe Hailey
- Children: 2, including Kendall Hailey

Oliver Hailey (July 7, 1932 – January 23, 1993) was an American screenwriter and playwright. Hailey's television writing credits include episodes of Bracken's World and McMillan & Wife. He was nominated for a Primetime Emmy Award for writing the 1981 television film Sidney Shorr: A Girl's Best Friend. As a playwright, Hailey wrote over 20 plays, three of which were produced on Broadway.

== Career ==
Hailey wrote for various television series including episodes of Bracken's World, McMillan & Wife, Family, and The Cosby Show. He also co-wrote the screenplay for the 1979 theatrical film Just You and Me, Kid, and wrote the 1981 television films Isabel's Choice and Sidney Shorr: A Girl's Best Friend, the latter of which featured one of the earliest depictions of a gay man on American prime time television. Sidney Shorr earned Hailey the Writers Guild of America Award for Best Original Comedy Anthology, as well as a nomination for the Primetime Emmy Award for Outstanding Writing in a Limited Series or a Special.

While writing for television and film was Hailey's main livelihood, his preference was for writing stage plays. Hailey wrote over 20 plays, many of which were produced regionally or Off-Broadway. Three of his plays were produced on Broadway: First One Asleep, Whistle opened and closed at the Belasco Theatre on February 26, 1966; Father's Day opened and closed at the John Golden Theatre on March 16, 1971; and I Won't Dance opened and closed at the Helen Hayes Theatre on May 10, 1981. All three of his Broadway plays closed after playing just one regular performance each, with one reviewer describing Hailey as the "most produced, least successful" New York theater playwright. Despite only running for one performance, the Broadway production of Father's Day received nominations for Best Actress in a Play (Marian Seldes) and Best Scenic Design (Jo Mielziner) at the 25th Tony Awards.

Many of Hailey's works fall under the "black comedy" genre, with a common theme of exploring familial and personal relationships. Hailey said his plays are mainly the result of him trying to find humorous takes on a serious subject matter. He added: "I try not to start writing until I have found a comic point of view for the material."

== Personal life ==
Hailey was born on July 7, 1932, in Pampa, Texas. His parents were Oliver D. and Hallie May Hailey (née Thomas); his father worked as a butcher. When he was young, Hailey was determined to move out of his hometown and used to dream about one day writing a book called Content to be Common, which was to be "all about those people who were content to stay in tiny little houses in that Godforsaken town in West Texas."

After graduating with a Bachelor of Fine Arts from the University of Texas at Austin in 1954, Hailey spent three years serving in the United States Air Force. He worked as a reporter for The Dallas Morning News from 1957 to 1959, and graduated with a Master of Fine Arts from the Yale School of Drama in 1962.

Hailey met journalist Elizabeth Forsythe while working for The Dallas Morning News. The couple were married in 1960 and have two daughters, Brooke and Kendall Hailey. Hailey died from liver cancer on January 23, 1993, at the age of 60.
