= Tony Randall =

American actor (1920–2004)

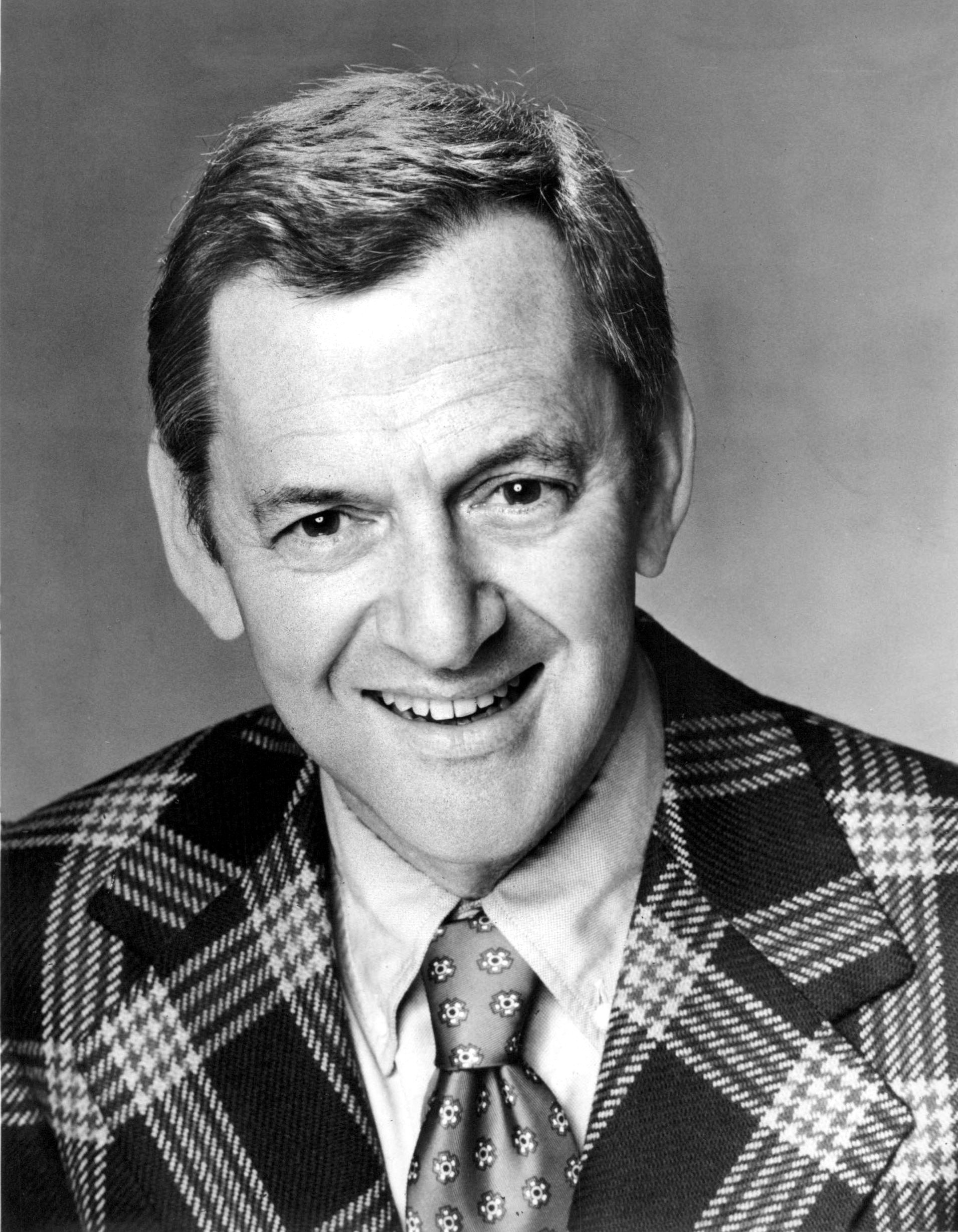
- Randall in 1976
- Born: Aryeh Leonard Rosenberg; February 26, 1920; Tulsa, Oklahoma, U.S.
- Died: May 17, 2004 (aged 84); New York City, U.S.
- Burial place: Westchester Hills Cemetery, Hastings-on-Hudson, New York
- Occupations: Actor; comedian; director; producer; singer
- Years active: 1941–2004
- Spouses: Florence Gibbs (m. 1938; died 1992) Heather Harlan (m. 1995)
- Children: 2

Anthony Leonard Randall (born Aryeh Leonard Rosenberg; February 26, 1920 – May 17, 2004) was an American actor, comedian, director, producer and singer, active in film, television and stage.

He is most notable for portraying the role of Felix Unger in the 1970–1975 television adaptation of the 1965 play The Odd Couple by Neil Simon. In a career spanning six decades, Randall received six Golden Globe Award nominations and six Primetime Emmy Award nominations, winning one Emmy.

== Early life and education ==
Randall was born to a Jewish family in Tulsa, Oklahoma, the son of Julia (née Finston) and Mogscha Rosenberg. Mogscha was an art and antiques dealer. He attended Tulsa Central High School, then Northwestern University, where he studied speech and drama, leaving for New York after one year to study at the Neighborhood Playhouse School of the Theatre. He studied under Sanford Meisner and choreographer Martha Graham.

== Career ==
=== Early career and military ===
Randall worked as an announcer at radio station WTAG in Worcester, Massachusetts. As Anthony Randall, he starred with Jane Cowl in George Bernard Shaw's Candida and Ethel Barrymore in Emlyn Williams's The Corn Is Green.

Randall was in the United States Army Signal Corps for five years, including work during World War II at Arlington Hall for the codebreaking Signal Intelligence Service. He rose to the rank of first lieutenant prior to his discharge.

=== Early postwar career ===
After the war, Randall worked at the Olney Theatre in Montgomery County, Maryland, before returning to New York City.

In 1946, he was cast as one of the brothers in a touring production of Katharine Cornell's revival of The Barretts of Wimpole Street.

Randall appeared on Broadway in Cornell's production of Antony and Cleopatra (1947–48) with Cornell, Charlton Heston, and Maureen Stapleton, and in Caesar and Cleopatra (1949–50) with Cedric Hardwicke and Lilli Palmer. He began appearing on television, notably episodes of One Man's Family.

Randall played the character Reggie York in the 1949-1952 revival of the radio adventure series I Love a Mystery.

=== Mister Peepers ===
Randall's first major television role was as history teacher Harvey Weskit in Mister Peepers (1952–1955). He continued to guest-star on other shows such as The Gulf Playhouse (directed by Arthur Penn), The Pepsi-Cola Playhouse, Kraft Theatre, The Motorola Television Hour, Armstrong Circle Theatre, Studio One in Hollywood, Appointment with Adventure, and The Philco-Goodyear Television Playhouse.

Randall replaced Gig Young in the Broadway hit Oh, Men! Oh, Women! (1954).

=== Inherit the Wind ===
Randall's first major role in a Broadway hit was in Inherit the Wind (1955–1957), portraying newspaperman E. K. Hornbeck (based on real-life cynic H. L. Mencken), alongside Ed Begley and Paul Muni. On television he appeared in Heaven Will Protect the Working Girl (1956), co-written by Neil Simon. He also guest-starred on The Alcoa Hour.

=== Film star ===
Randall's success in Inherit the Wind led to film offers and his first significant big-screen role in Oh, Men! Oh, Women! (1957) for 20th Century Fox, which promoted Randall to stardom with Will Success Spoil Rock Hunter? (1957) alongside Jayne Mansfield. He played one of the leads in No Down Payment (1957). He was replaced with Dean Martin shortly before the filming of Fox's The Young Lions.

In 1958, Randall played the leading role in the Broadway musical comedy Oh, Captain!, taking on a role originated on film by Alec Guinness. The show was a financial failure, but Randall received a Tony Award nomination for his dance turn with prima ballerina Alexandra Danilova.

Randall appeared in Westinghouse Desilu Playhouse, Goodyear Theatre, The United States Steel Hour, Sunday Showcase and Playhouse 90.

=== Continuing success ===
Randall co-starred with Debbie Reynolds in The Mating Game (1959) at Metro-Goldwyn-Mayer. He appeared in the hit film Pillow Talk (1959) supporting Doris Day and Rock Hudson, for which he was nominated for a Golden Globe Award for Best Supporting Actor. He would reunite with Day and Hudson for two more films, Lover Come Back (1961), which earned him another Golden Globe Best Supporting Actor nomination, and Send Me No Flowers (1964).

Randall starred in an NBC-TV special, The Secret of Freedom, which was filmed during the summer of 1959 in Mount Holly, New Jersey, and broadcast on the network during the fall of 1959 and again in early 1960. On TV he was also in The Man in the Moon (1960), co-written by Mel Brooks.

Randall was top-billed in The Adventures of Huckleberry Finn from MGM in 1960. He had a Pillow Talk-style supporting role in Let's Make Love (1960) with Marilyn Monroe and Yves Montand, and Lover Come Back (1961) with Hudson and Day. Randall continued to guest on TV shows including General Electric Theater and Checkmate. In 1961, Randall played a highly dramatic role in "Hangover," an episode of The Alfred Hitchcock Hour in which he portrayed an alcoholic advertising executive spiraling into self-destruction. He starred in a TV adaptation of Arsenic & Old Lace (1962), and had big-screen leading roles in Boys' Night Out (1962) and Island of Love (1963).

In 1964, Randall starred in the classic MGM film, 7 Faces of Dr. Lao, which was based on The Circus of Dr. Lao by Charles G. Finney. In addition to portraying and voicing the eponymous seven faces (Dr. Lao, the Abominable Snowman, Merlin, Apollonius of Tyana, The Giant Serpent, Pan, and Medusa), Randall also appeared without makeup in a two-second cameo as a solemn spectator in the crowd, for a total of eight roles in the film.

He played the lead in The Brass Bottle (1964) and made one last film with Hudson and Day, Send Me No Flowers (1964). Randall took the lead in Fluffy (1965), a comedy about a lion; The Alphabet Murders (1965), playing Hercule Poirot for Frank Tashlin; Our Man in Marrakesh (1966), as a secret agent; and Hello Down There (1969).

Randall returned to Broadway in UTBU (1966), which had only a short run. He appeared in the TV movie The Littlest Angel (1969) with Johnny Whitaker and Fred Gwynne.

=== The Odd Couple ===
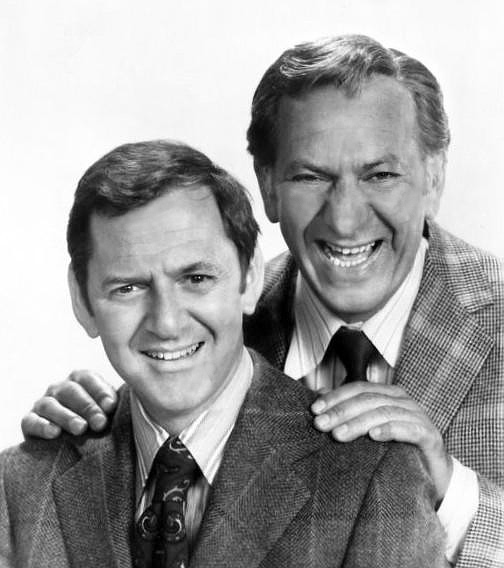
Randall with Jack Klugman in a publicity photo of The Odd Couple, 1972

Randall returned to television in 1970 as Felix Unger in The Odd Couple, opposite Jack Klugman, a role that lasted five years. The names of Felix's children in The Odd Couple were Edna and Leonard, named for Randall's sister and Randall himself.

In 1974, Randall and Klugman appeared in television spots endorsing a Yahtzee spinoff, Challenge Yahtzee. They appeared in character as Felix and Oscar, and the TV spots were filmed on the set of The Odd Couple.

During the series run, Randall took a small role in Everything You Always Wanted to Know About Sex* (*But Were Afraid to Ask) (1972).

In 1973, he was hired to play the voice of Templeton the gluttonous rat in Charlotte's Web, and recorded the part, but was replaced in the film by Paul Lynde. Randall's voice was perceived as too sophisticated by co-director Iwao Takamoto, who wanted Templeton to have a nasal voice.

=== The Tony Randall Show ===
Beginning in 1976, Randall starred for two seasons in The Tony Randall Show, playing Philadelphia judge Walter Franklin. He had roles in Kate Bliss and the Ticker Tape Kid (1978), Scavenger Hunt (1979), and Foolin' Around (1980).

=== Love, Sidney ===
Randall starred in the NBC series Love, Sidney from 1981 to 1983. In the TV movie that served as the show's pilot, Sidney Shorr: A Girl's Best Friend, Sidney Shorr was written as a middle-aged homosexual man; the character's sexuality was made ambiguous for the series. After the show was canceled in 1983, Randall refused to star in another television series, favoring the Broadway stage as his medium.

Randall continued to appear in TV movies. He starred in Sunday Drive (1986) for Disney, Save the Dog! (1988), and The Man in the Brown Suit (1989). From October 30 to November 2, 1987, he hosted the free preview of HBO's short-lived premium channel Festival.

In 1989, Randall returned to Broadway as a replacement in M. Butterfly.

=== National Actors Theatre ===
In 1991, Randall founded the National Actors Theatre, ultimately based at Pace University in New York City. Their productions included The Crucible (1991), A Little Hotel on the Side (1992), The Master Builder (1992), The Seagull (1992), Saint Joan (1993), Three Men on a Horse (1993), Timon of Athens (1993), The Government Inspector (1993), The Flowering Peach (1994), Gentlemen Prefer Blondes (1994), The School for Scandal (1995), Inherit the Wind (1996), and The Gin Game (1997). In 1997, he performed in The Sunshine Boys with Klugman to great success.

In September 1993, Randall and Klugman reunited in the CBS-TV movie The Odd Couple: Together Again, reprising their roles. The story began when, after Felix ruined plans for his daughter Edna's wedding, his wife Gloria threw him out of the house for 11 days, which left him no choice but to move back in with Oscar and to help him recover, getting him back in shape after throat cancer surgery had left his voice very raspy.

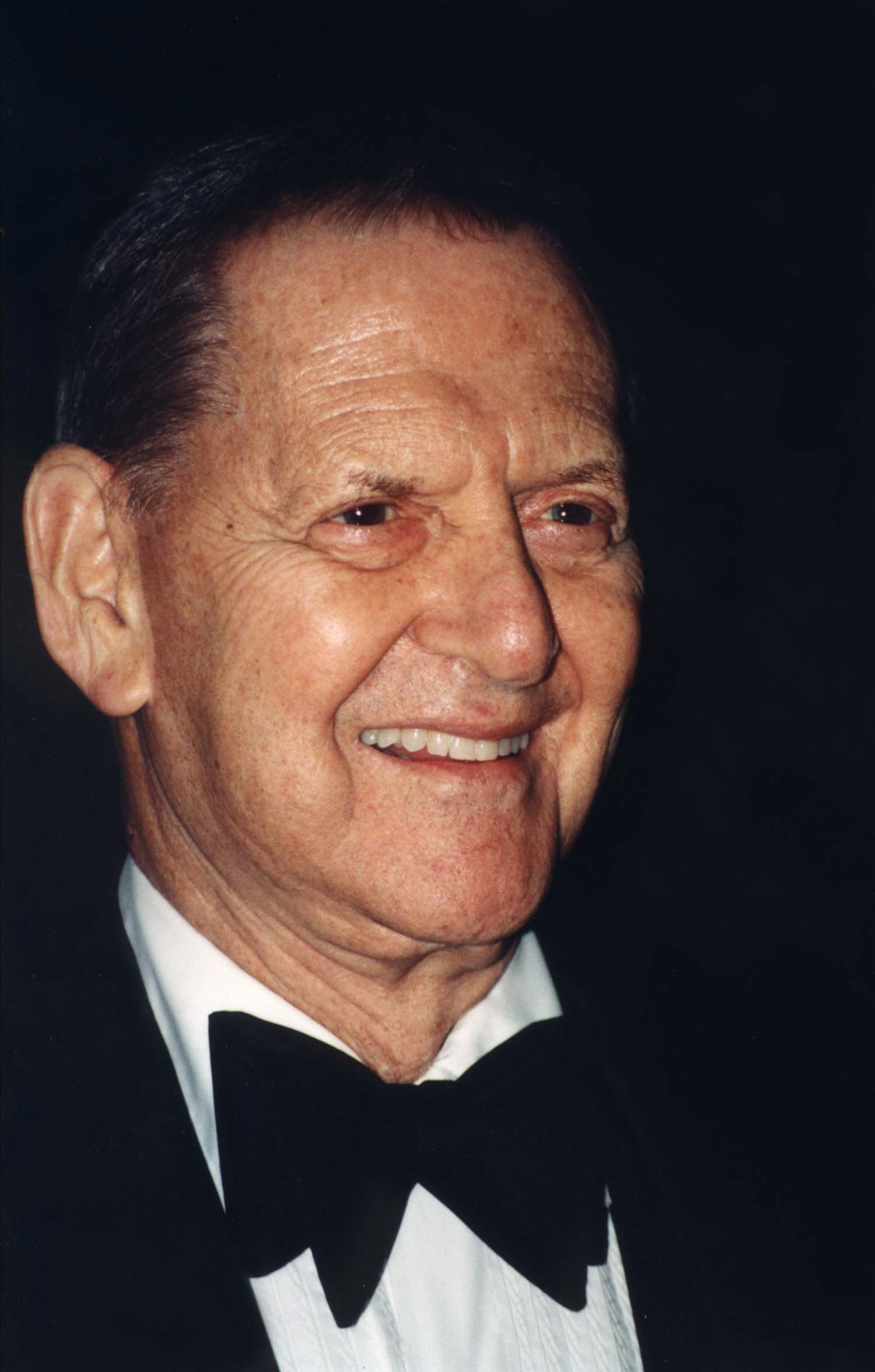
Randall in 2001

Randall's later stage productions included Night Must Fall (1999) and Judgment at Nuremberg (2001).

Periodically, he performed in stage revivals of The Odd Couple with Klugman, including a stint in London in 1996. Later film roles included Fatal Instinct (1994) and Down with Love (2003).

Randall's last appearances on stage as an actor were in The Resistible Rise of Arturo Ui (2002) and Right You Are (2003).

=== Guest appearances ===
On September 4, 1955, Randall and Klugman appeared together with Gena Rowlands in the episode "The Pirate's House" of the CBS anthology series Appointment with Adventure.

Randall was a frequent guest on The Tonight Show Starring Johnny Carson and often spoke of his love of opera and the salaciousness of many of its plotlines. He also admitted to sneaking tape recorders into operas to make his own private recordings. He chided Johnny Carson for his chain smoking and was generally fastidious. At the time of his death, Randall had appeared as a guest on The Tonight Show 105 times, more often than any other celebrity had appeared.

Randall was well-known for being a guest panelist on the game show What’s My Line?, from 1958 to 1967, Password, The Hollywood Squares, and the $10,000 and $20,000 Pyramids. He also parodied his pompous image with an appearance as a "contestant" on The Gong Show in 1977.

Randall was a guest star on the fifth and final season of The Muppet Show in an episode that first aired on October 11, 1980. This was the 100th episode of the show.

Randall, along with John Goodman and Drew Barrymore, was among the first guests on the debut episode of Late Night with Conan O'Brien on September 13, 1993. He would also appear in Conan O'Brien's 5th Anniversary Special with the character PimpBot 5000. Randall was a frequent guest as well on both of David Letterman's late-night shows Late Night with David Letterman and the Late Show with David Letterman, making 70 appearances, according to his obituary in The Washington Post. Letterman said that Randall was one of his favorite guests, along with Regis Philbin.

On November 7, 1994, Randall appeared on the game show Jeopardy!, as part of a celebrity episode, playing on behalf of the National Actors Theatre. He came in second place behind General Norman Schwarzkopf Jr. but ahead of actress Stefanie Powers, with a final tally of $9,900.

=== Other creative activities ===
In 1973, Randall and Klugman recorded an album for London Records titled The Odd Couple Sings. Roland Shaw and the London Festival Orchestra and Chorus provided the accompaniment and additional vocals. The record was not a chart-topper but is a highly sought-after item for many Odd Couple fans. Randall and Klugman also collaborated on a series of television commercials for Eagle brand snacks.

Randall, along with co-writer Mike Mindlin, wrote a collection of show business anecdotes called Which Reminds Me, published in 1989.

During the Big Band-era revival in the mid-1960s, Randall produced a record album of 1930s songs, Vo, Vo, De, Oh, Doe, inspired by (and covering) the New Vaudeville Band's one-hit wonder, "Winchester Cathedral."

In the 1980s, Randall served as off-camera narrator for several video productions by the Metropolitan Opera, announcing performers to the television audience as they appeared on stage during curtain calls and providing brief descriptions of scenes.

For the 1990 sequel Gremlins 2: The New Batch, Randall voiced the Brain Gremlin.

== Advocacy and political views ==
Randall was an advocate for the arts. During the summer of 1980, he served as the celebrity host of the New York Philharmonic Orchestra's concerts in Central Park, New York City.

Randall was politically liberal. He was an active supporter of Eugene McCarthy during the 1968 Democratic Party presidential primaries. When he was dropped as a regular panelist on the Opera Quiz intermission feature of the Metropolitan Opera radio broadcasts because of his opposition to the Vietnam War, he donated the remainder of his contract fee to the McCarthy campaign. During the U.S. presidential primaries in 1972, he appeared as the featured celebrity at numerous fundraising house parties for Democratic Party candidate George McGovern. His name was featured on the master list of Richard Nixon's political opponents.

== Personal life ==
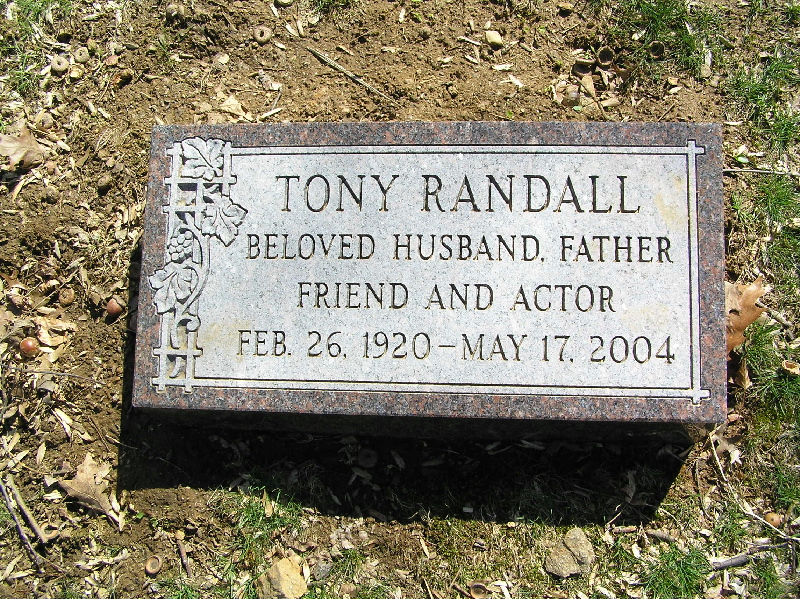
Randall's footstone in Westchester Hills Cemetery

Randall was married to his high school sweetheart, Florence Gibbs, from 1938 until her death from cancer on April 18, 1992. They had no children. On November 17, 1995, at the age of 75, he married 25-year-old Heather Harlan, an understudy from the production of The School for Scandal in which Randall was starring at National Actors Theatre; the ceremony was officiated by Rudy Giuliani. They lived in a Manhattan apartment and bought a vacation apartment in Key Biscayne, Florida, in 2003. The couple had two children, a girl and a boy, and remained married until Randall's death in May 2004.

In his book Which Reminds Me, Randall said that any publicity that an actor generates should be about his work, not himself: "The public knows only one thing about me: I don't smoke."

== Death ==
Randall died in his sleep on May 17, 2004, at NYU Medical Center of pneumonia that he had contracted following coronary bypass surgery in December 2003. He had been hospitalized since the operation. His remains are interred at the Westchester Hills Cemetery in Hastings-on-Hudson, New York.

== Filmography ==
Year	Title	Role	Notes
1942	Saboteur	Cameraman	Uncredited
1957	Oh, Men! Oh, Women!	Cobbler	
1957	Will Success Spoil Rock Hunter?	Rockwell P. Hunter/Himself/Lover Doll	
1957	No Down Payment	Jerry Flagg	
1959	The Mating Game	Lorenzo Charlton	
1959	Pillow Talk	Jonathan Forbes	
1960	The Man in the Moon		TV movie
1960	The Adventures of Huckleberry Finn	The King of France	
1960	Let's Make Love	Alexander Coffman	
1960	Hooray for Love		TV movie
1960	Open Windows		TV movie
1961	Lover Come Back	Peter 'Pete' Ramsey	
1962	The Alfred Hitchcock Hour	Hadley 'Had' Purvis	Episode: "Hangover"
1962	Arsenic & Old Lace	Mortimer Brewster	TV movie
1962	Boys' Night Out	George Drayton	
1962	Two Weeks in Another Town	Ad Lib in Lounge	Uncredited
1963	Island of Love	Paul Ferris	
1964	7 Faces of Dr. Lao	Dr. Lao / Merlin / Pan / Abominable Snowman / Medusa / Giant Serpent / Apollonius of Tyana	
1964	The Brass Bottle	Harold Ventimore	
1964	Robin and the 7 Hoods	Hood	Uncredited
1964	Send Me No Flowers	Arnold	
1965	Fluffy	Prof. Daniel Potter	
1965	The Alphabet Murders	Hercule Poirot	
1966	Our Man in Marrakesh	Andrew Jessel	Alternate title: Bang! Bang! You're Dead!
1969	Hello Down There	Fred Miller	Alternate title: Sub-A-Dub-Dub
1969	The Littlest Angel	Democritus	TV movie
1970-1975	The Odd Couple	Felix Unger	TV sitcom (114 episodes)
1972	Everything You Always Wanted to Know About Sex* (*But Were Afraid to Ask)	The Operator	
1973	The All-American Boy		Uncredited
1976-1978	The Tony Randall Show	Walter Franklin	TV sitcom (44 episodes)
1978	Kate Bliss and the Ticker Tape Kid	Lord Seymour Devery	TV movie
1979	Scavenger Hunt	Henry Motley	
1980	The Gong Show Movie	Himself	
1980	Foolin' Around	Peddicord	
1981	Sidney Shorr: A Girl's Best Friend	Sidney Shorr	TV movie
1981-1983	Love, Sidney	Sidney Shorr	TV sitcom (44 episodes)
1982	The King of Comedy	Himself	
1984	My Little Pony: Rescue at Midnight Castle	The Moochick (voice)	TV movie
1984	Off Sides (Pigs vs. Freaks)	Rambaba Organimus	TV movie
1985	The Fantasy Film Worlds of George Pal	Himself	
1985	Hitler's SS: Portrait in Evil	Putzi	TV movie
1986	My Little Pony: The Movie	The Moochick (voice)	
1986	Sunday Drive	Uncle Bill	TV movie
1987	Lyle, Lyle Crocodile: The Musical - The House on East 88th Street	Narrator / Signor Valenti (voice)	TV movie
1987	The Gnomes' Great Adventure	Gnome King / Ghost of the Black Lake (voice)	
1988	Save the Dog!	Oliver Bishop	TV movie
1989	The Man in the Brown Suit	Rev. Edward Chicester	TV movie
1989	It Had to Be You	Milton	
1990	That's Adequate	Host	Mockumentary
1990	Gremlins 2: The New Batch	Brain Gremlin (voice)	
1991	The Boss	Narrator (voice)	Short
1993	The Odd Couple Together Again	Felix Unger	TV movie
1993	Fatal Instinct	Judge Skanky	
1995	The Magic School Bus	Radius Ulna 'R.U.' Humerus (voice)	Episode: "Flexes Its Muscles"
1996	How the Toys Saved Christmas	Mr. Grimm (voice)	
2003	Down with Love	Theodore Banner	
2005	It's About Time	Mr. Rosenberg	Posthumous release

== Awards and nominations ==
Year	Award	Category	Work	Result
1994	Drama Desk Awards	Outstanding Revival of a Play	Timon of Athens	Nominated
1997	Drama Desk Awards	Outstanding Revival of a Play	The Gin Game	Nominated
1957	Golden Globe Awards	Best Actor in a Motion Picture – Musical or Comedy	Will Success Spoil Rock Hunter?	Nominated
1959	Golden Globe Awards	Best Supporting Actor – Motion Picture	Pillow Talk	Nominated
1961	Golden Globe Awards	Best Supporting Actor – Motion Picture	Lover Come Back	Nominated
1976	Golden Globe Awards	Best Actor in a Television Series – Musical or Comedy	The Tony Randall Show	Nominated
1981	Golden Globe Awards	Best Actor in a Television Series – Musical or Comedy	Love, Sidney	Nominated
1982	Golden Globe Awards	Best Actor in a Television Series – Musical or Comedy	Love, Sidney	Nominated
1957	Laurel Awards	Top New Male Personality		6th Place
1958	Laurel Awards	Top Male Comedy Performance	The Mating Game	Nominated
1960	Laurel Awards	Top Male Supporting Performance	The Adventures of Huckleberry Finn	5th Place
1961	Laurel Awards	Top Male Comedy Performance	Lover Come Back	Nominated
1954	Primetime Emmy Awards	Best Series Supporting Actor	Mister Peepers	Nominated
1971	Primetime Emmy Awards	Outstanding Continued Performance by an Actor in a Leading Role in a Comedy Series	The Odd Couple	Nominated
1972	Primetime Emmy Awards	Outstanding Continued Performance by an Actor in a Leading Role in a Comedy Series	The Odd Couple	Nominated
1973	Primetime Emmy Awards	Outstanding Continued Performance by an Actor in a Leading Role in a Comedy Series	The Odd Couple	Nominated
1974	Primetime Emmy Awards	Best Lead Actor in a Comedy Series	The Odd Couple	Nominated
1975	Primetime Emmy Awards	Outstanding Lead Actor in a Comedy Series	The Odd Couple	Won
1958	Tony Awards	Best Leading Actor in a Musical	Oh, Captain!	Nominated
1993	Tony Awards	Best Revival	Saint Joan	Nominated
1994	Tony Awards	Best Revival of a Play	Timon of Athens	Nominated
1996	Tony Awards	Best Revival of a Play	Inherit the Wind	Nominated
1997	Tony Awards	Best Revival of a Play	The Gin Game	Nominated
2004	TV Land Awards	Quintessential Non-Traditional Family	The Odd Couple (Shared with Jack Klugman)	Won

=== Honors ===
- In 1993, he received The Hundred Year Association of New York's Gold Medal Award "in recognition of outstanding contributions to the City of New York."
- In 1999, the City College of New York honored Randall with the John H. Finley Award for outstanding service to the City of New York.
- In 2003, Pace University granted him an honorary Doctor of Fine Arts degree.

== Bibliography ==
- Randall, Tony; Mindlin, Michael (1989). Which Reminds Me. New York: Delacorte Press. ISBN 0-385-29785-8.
